= The Holy Land, Syria, Idumea, Arabia, Egypt, and Nubia =

19th-century travelogue by painter David Roberts

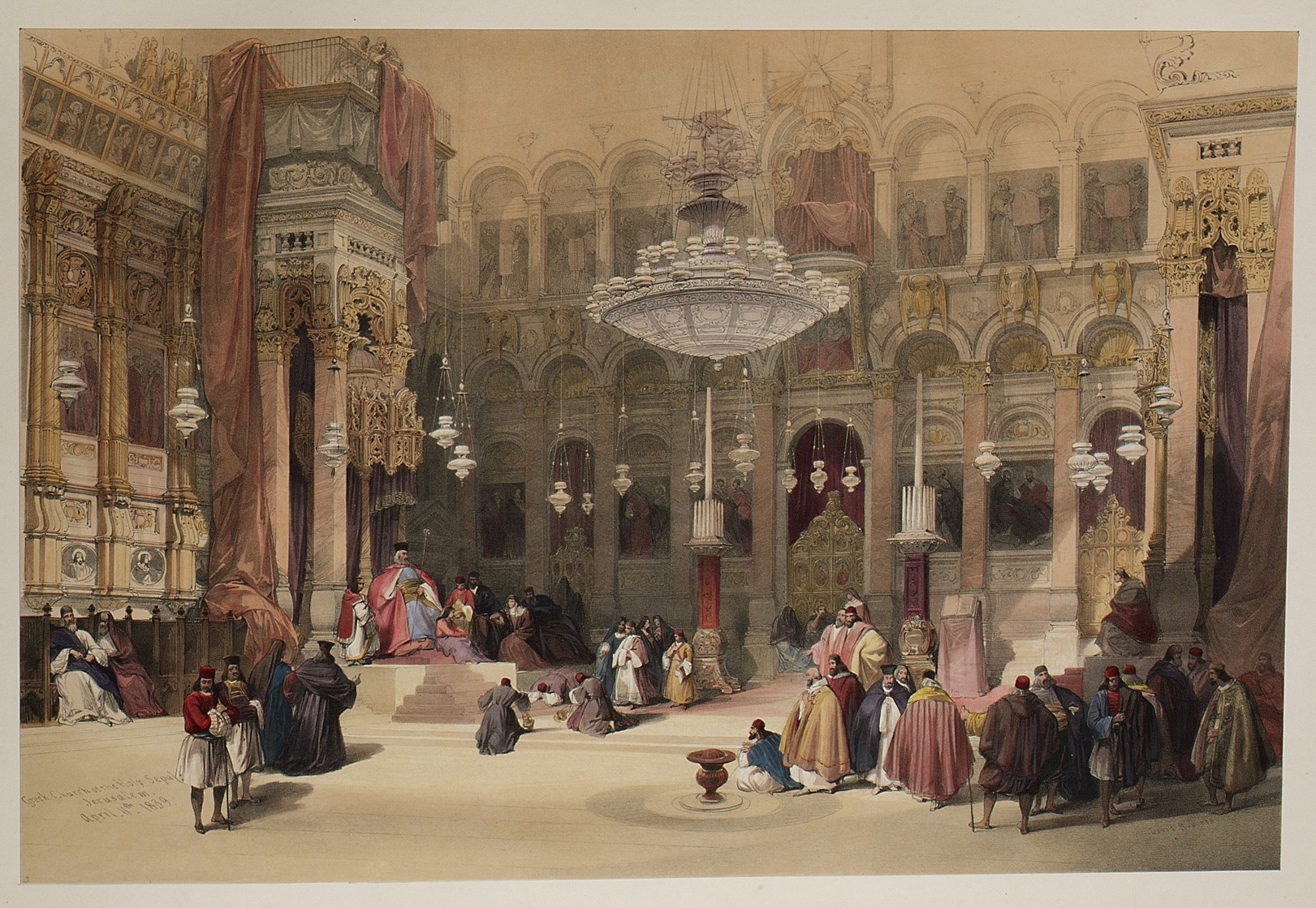
- Volume 1, plate 4: "Greek Church of the Holy Sepulchre"
- Author: David Roberts
- Illustrator: David Roberts and Louis Haghe
- Language: English
- Genre: Travel literature
- Publication date: 1842–1849

The Holy Land, Syria, Idumea, Arabia, Egypt, and Nubia is a travelogue of Palestine and the wider Middle East, and the magnum opus of Scottish painter David Roberts. It contains 250 lithographs by Louis Haghe of Roberts's watercolor sketches. It was first published by subscription between 1842 and 1849, in two separate publications: The Holy Land, Syria, Idumea and Arabia and Egypt and Nubia. William Brockedon and George Croly wrote much of the text, Croly writing the historical, and Brockedon the descriptive portions.

Described as "one of the art-publishing sensations of the mid-Victorian period", it exceeded all other earlier lithographic projects in scale, and was one of the most expensive publications of the nineteenth century. Haghe has been described by the Metropolitan Museum of Art as "the best and most prolific lithographer of the time".

According to Professor Annabel Wharton, it has "proved to be the most pervasive and enduring of the nineteenth-century renderings of the East circulated in the West."

== Travels and publication ==
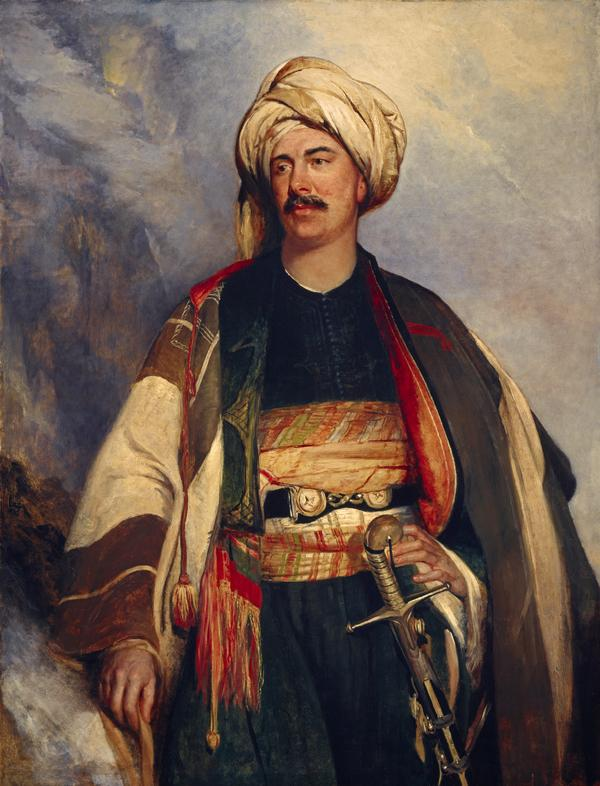
Portrait of David Roberts by Robert Scott Lauder, 1840

Roberts began his travel to the region in August 1838. He landed at Alexandria, and spent the rest of 1838 in Cairo. In February 1839 he traveled to Palestine via Suez, Mount Sinai and Petra. From Gaza he traveled to Jerusalem, and around the rest of the region. He returned to Britain at the end of 1839 after falling ill, having spent 11 months in the region. A total of 272 watercolour sketches were shared with the publisher F.G. Moon in 1840 who paid Roberts £3,000 for copyright to the sketches.

== Reaction ==
Famed Victorian art critic John Ruskin wrote the work was a "true portraiture of scenes of historical and religious interest. They are faithful and laborious beyond any outlines from nature I have ever seen."

Art historian John Roland Abbey wrote in his Travel in Aquatint and Lithography, 1770-1860 that "Robert's Holy Land was one of the most important and elaborate ventures of nineteenth-century publishing, and it was the apotheosis of the tinted lithograph".

John James Moscrop noted in a recent work on nineteenth-century knowledge of Palestine: "The best known of the illustrators was David Roberts. If Robinson produced the nineteenth century's historical geography of the Holy Land, it fell to a Scottish painter, David Roberts, to illustrate it."

== List of lithographs ==
=== Volume 1 ===
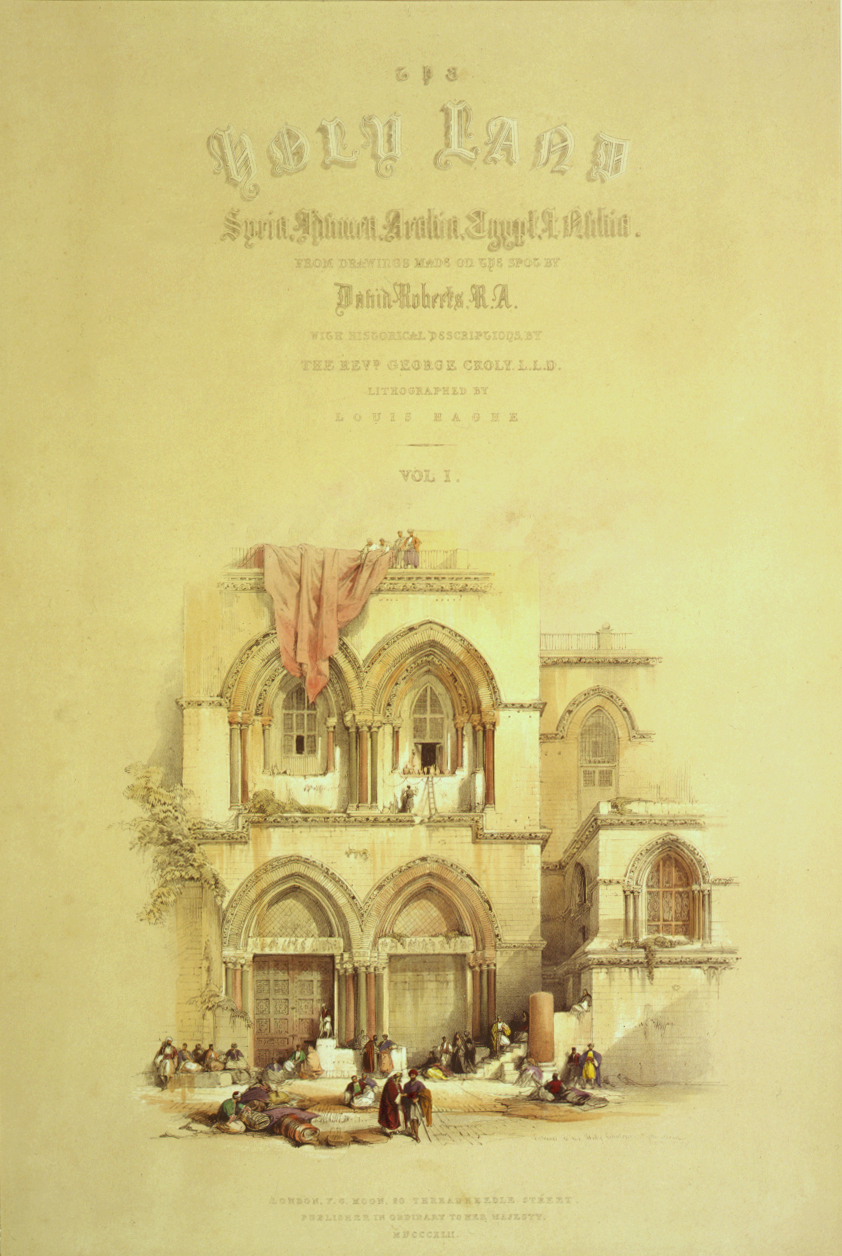
2. Entrance to the Holy Sepulchre

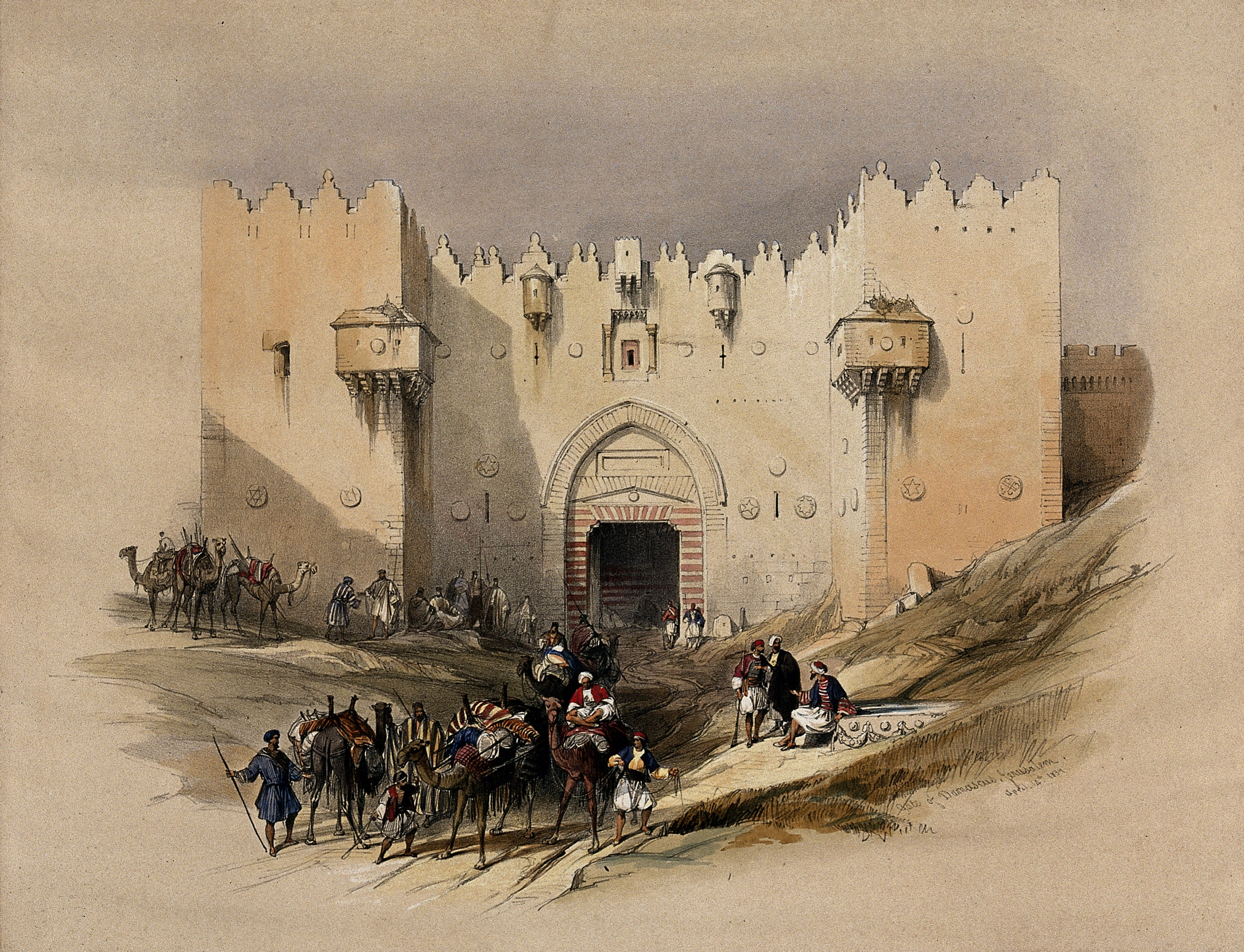
3. Damascus Gate

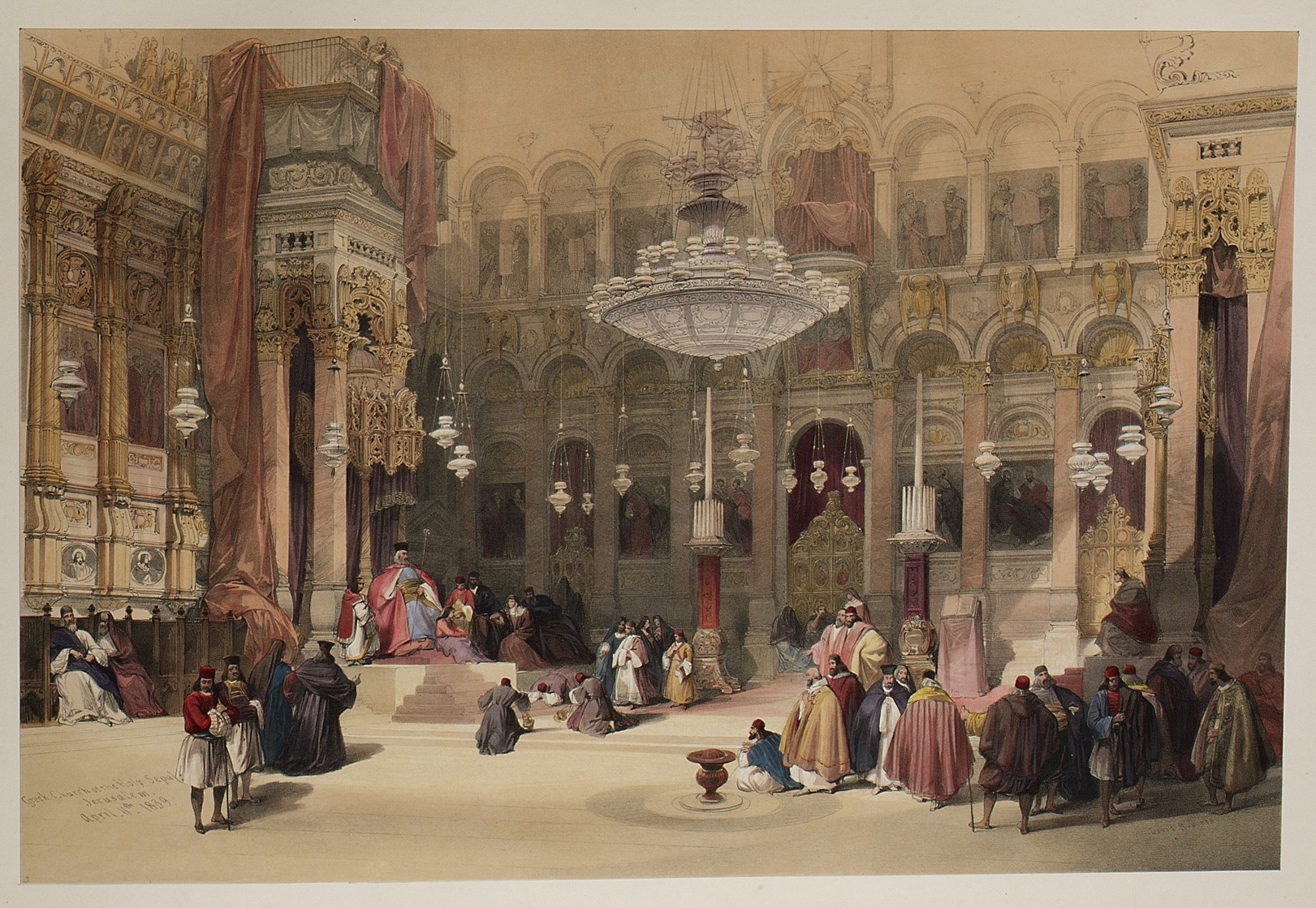
4. Greek Church of the Holy Sepulchre

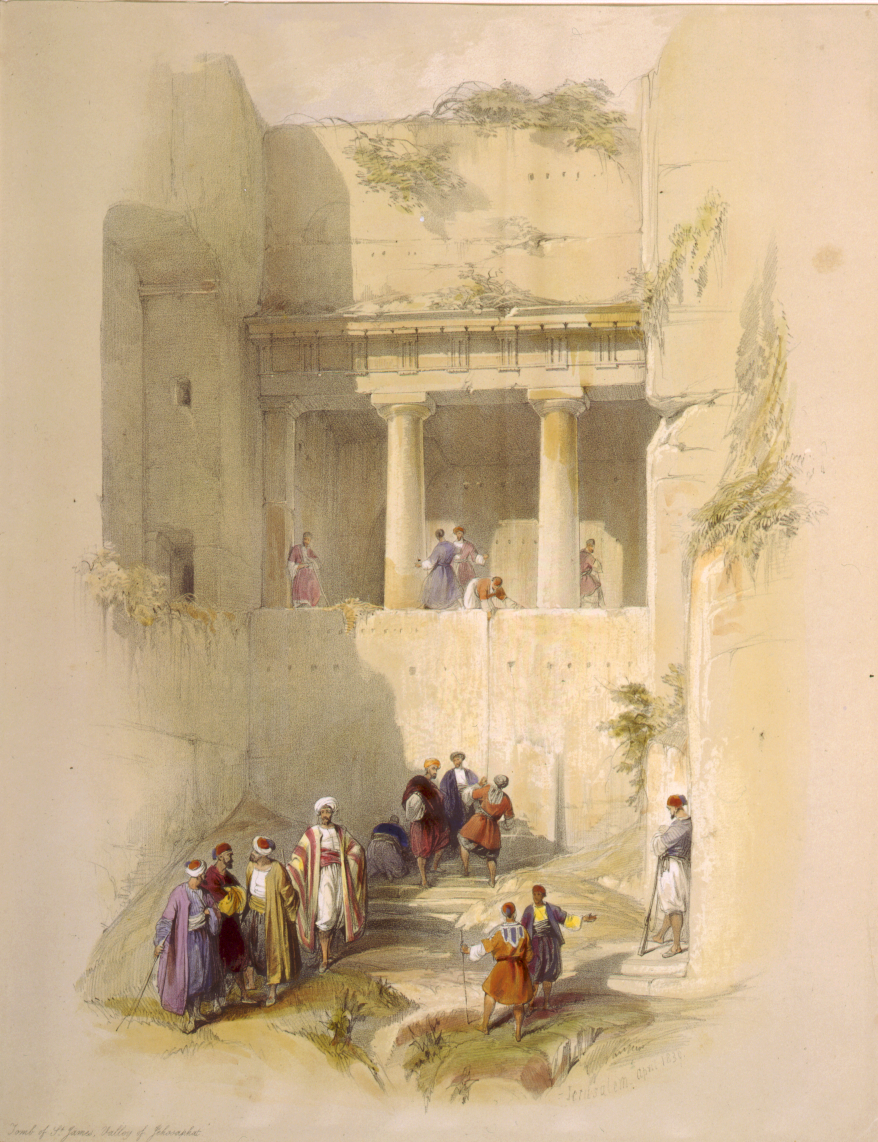
5. Tomb of St. James

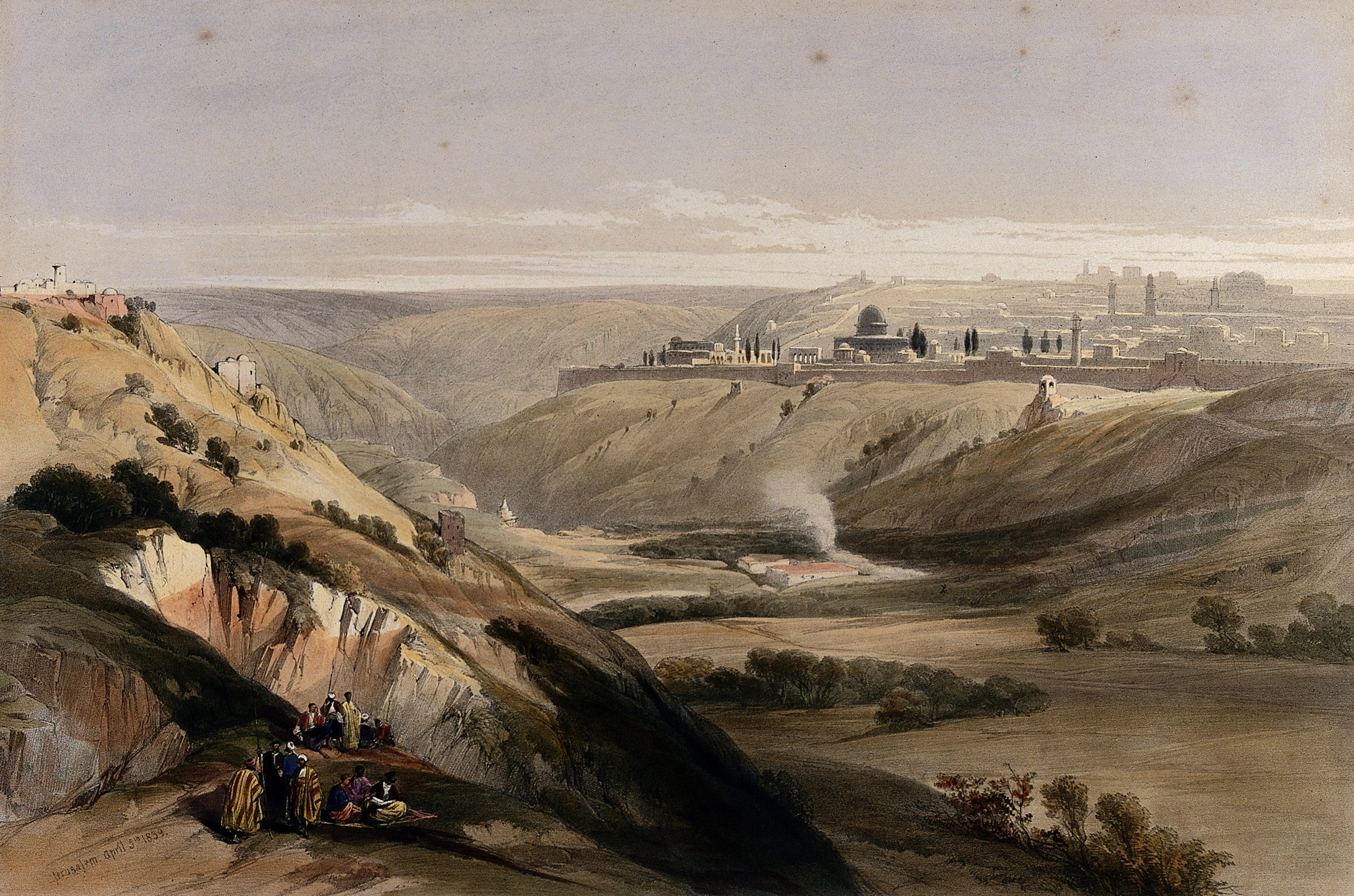
6. Jerusalem from the road leading to Bethany.

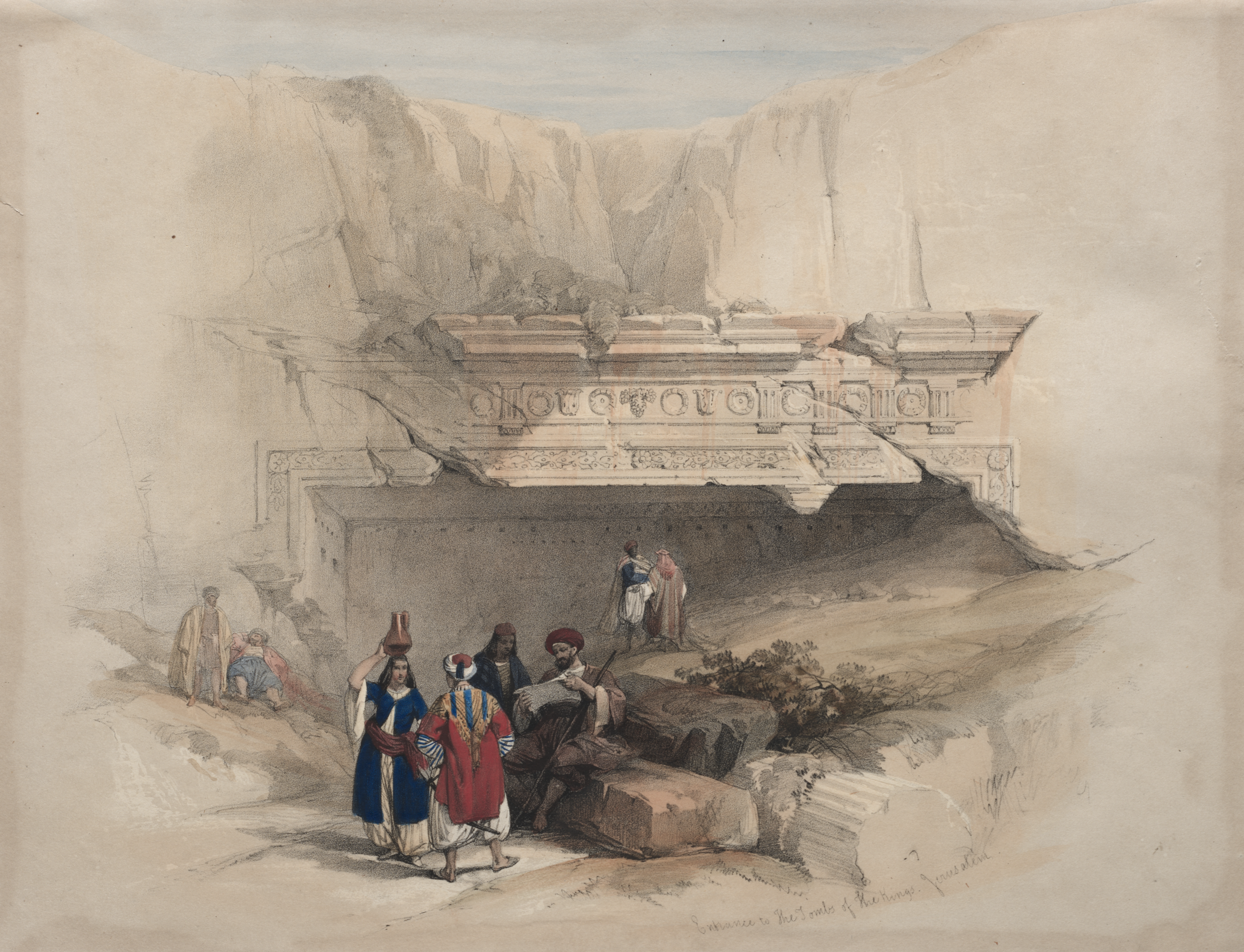
7. Entrance to the Tomb of the Kings

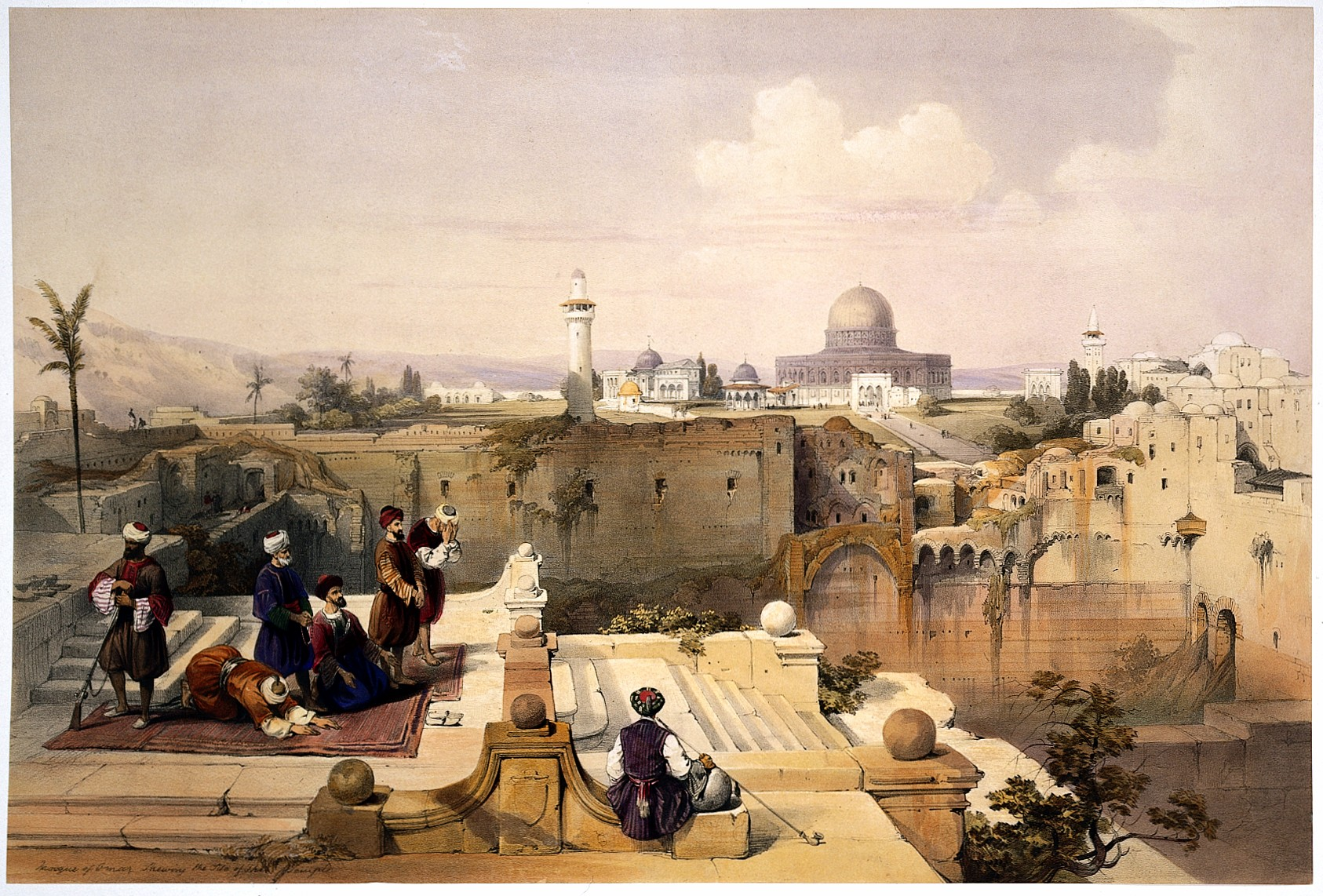
8. Mosque of Omar, on the ancient site of the Temple.

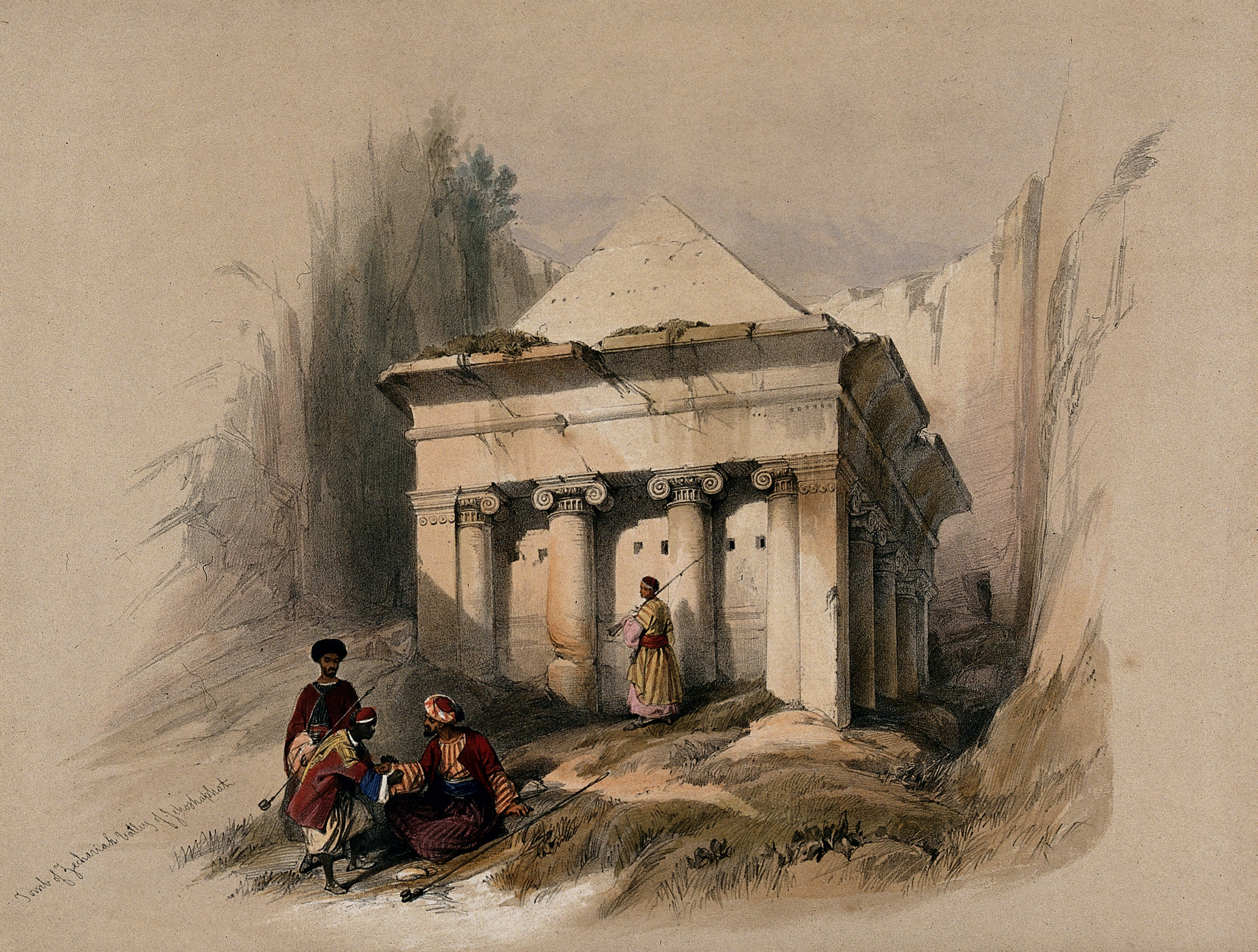
9. Tomb of Zechariah

10. Jerusalem, from the South.

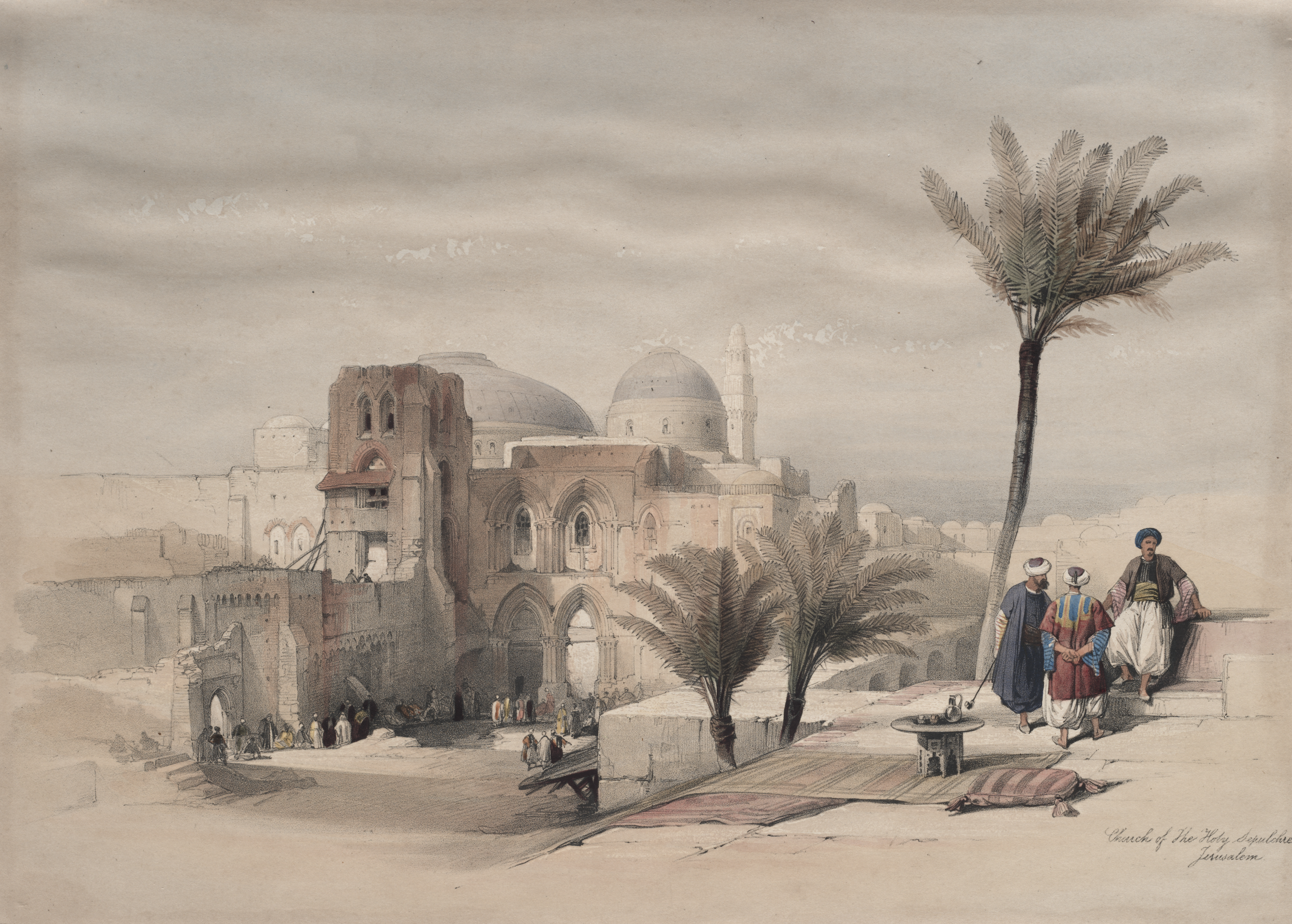
11. Exterior of the Holy Sepulchre

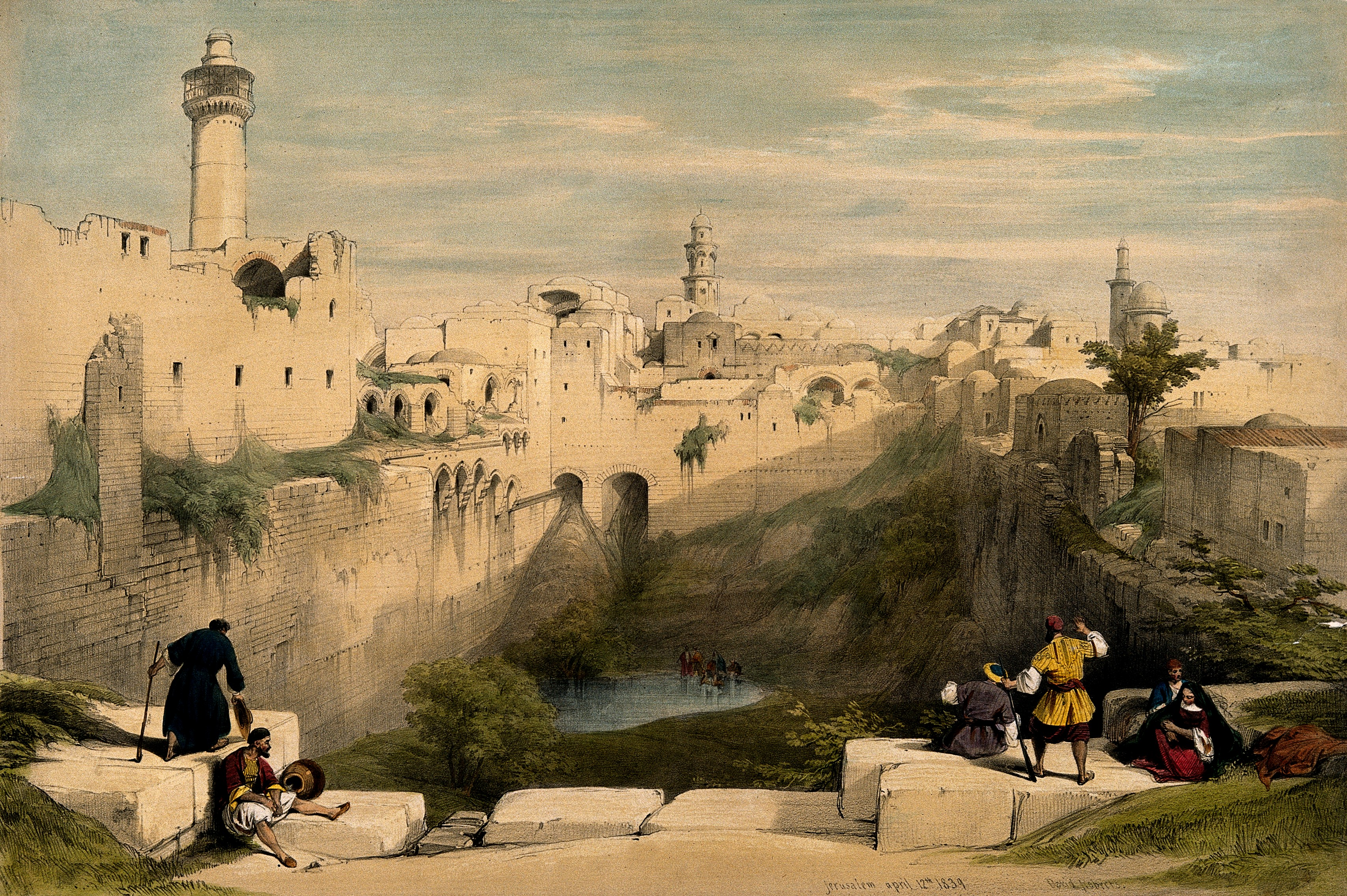
12. The Pool of Bethesda

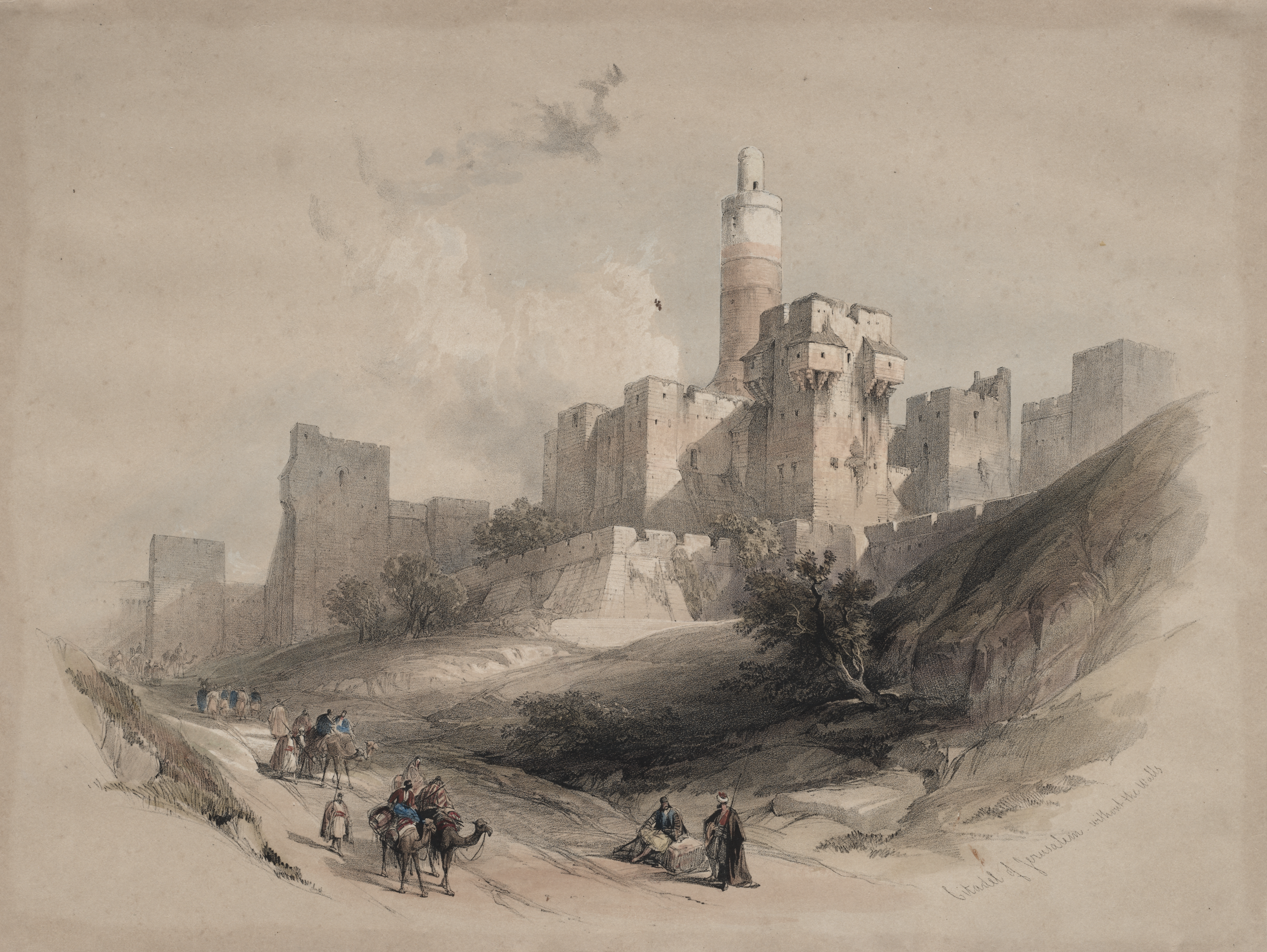
13. The Tower of David

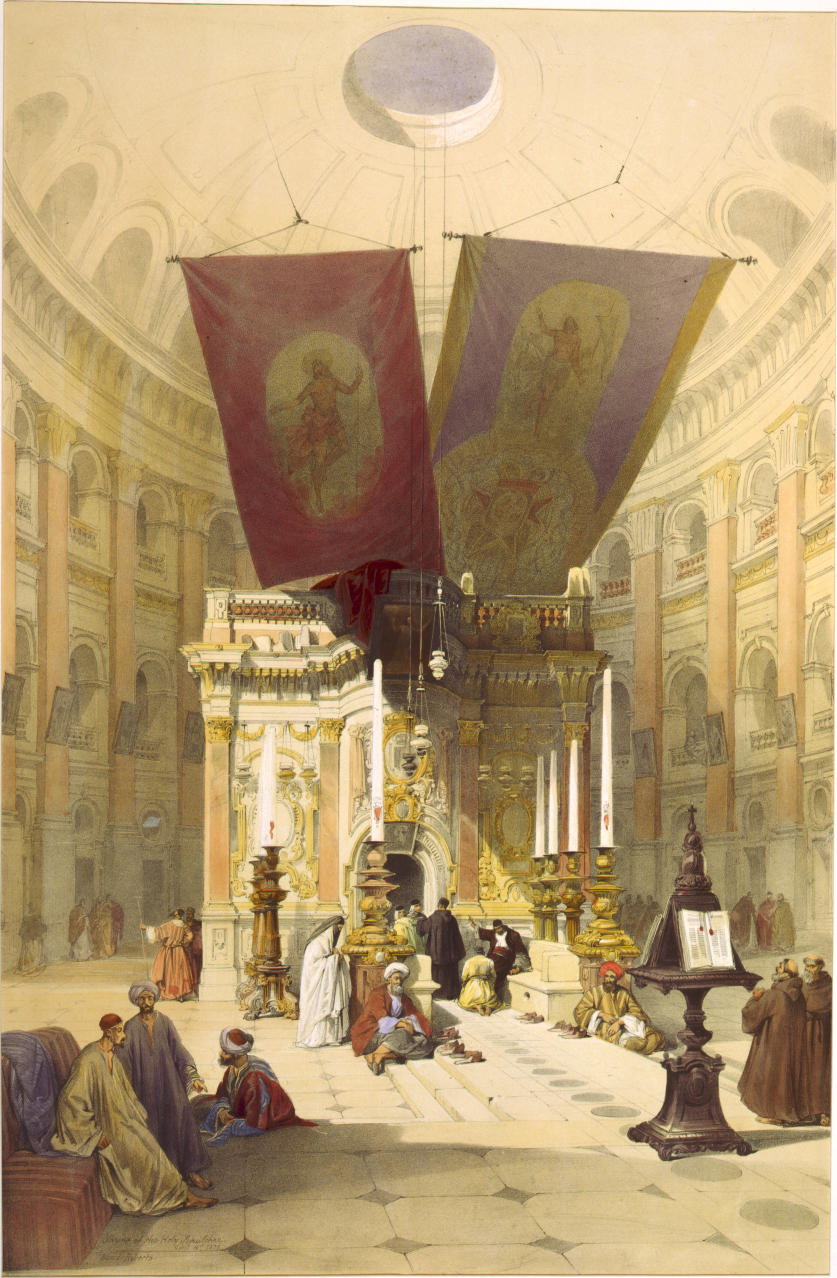
14. Shrine of the Holy Sepulchre

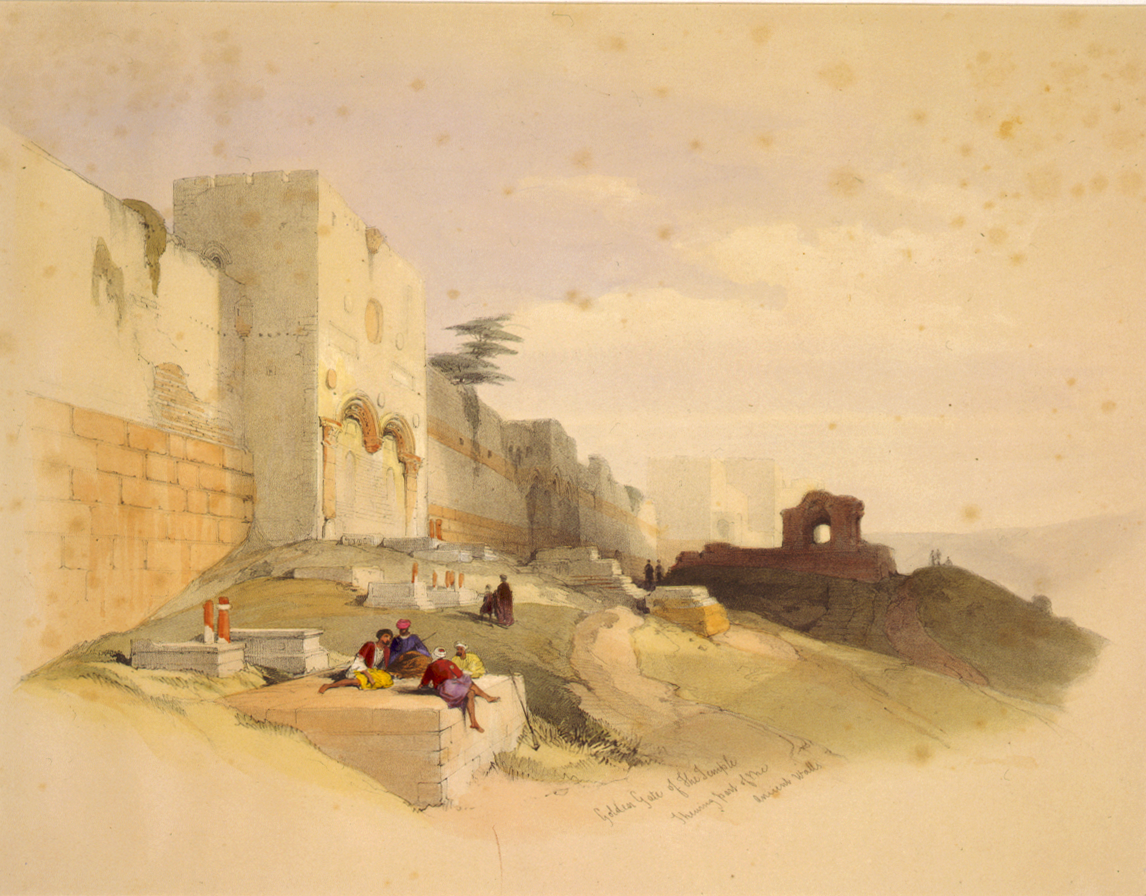
15. The Golden Gate

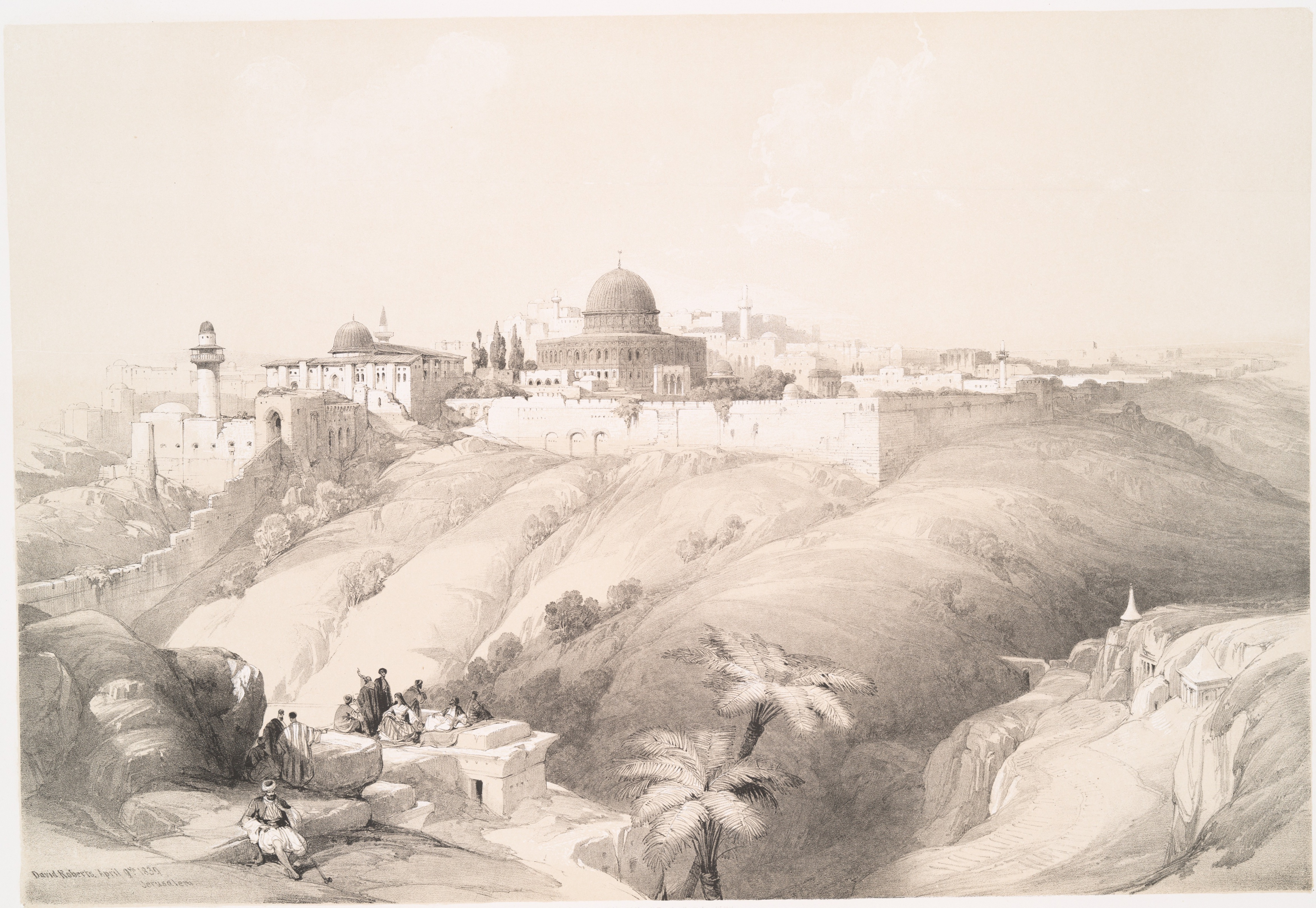
16. Jerusalem. The Church of the Purification.

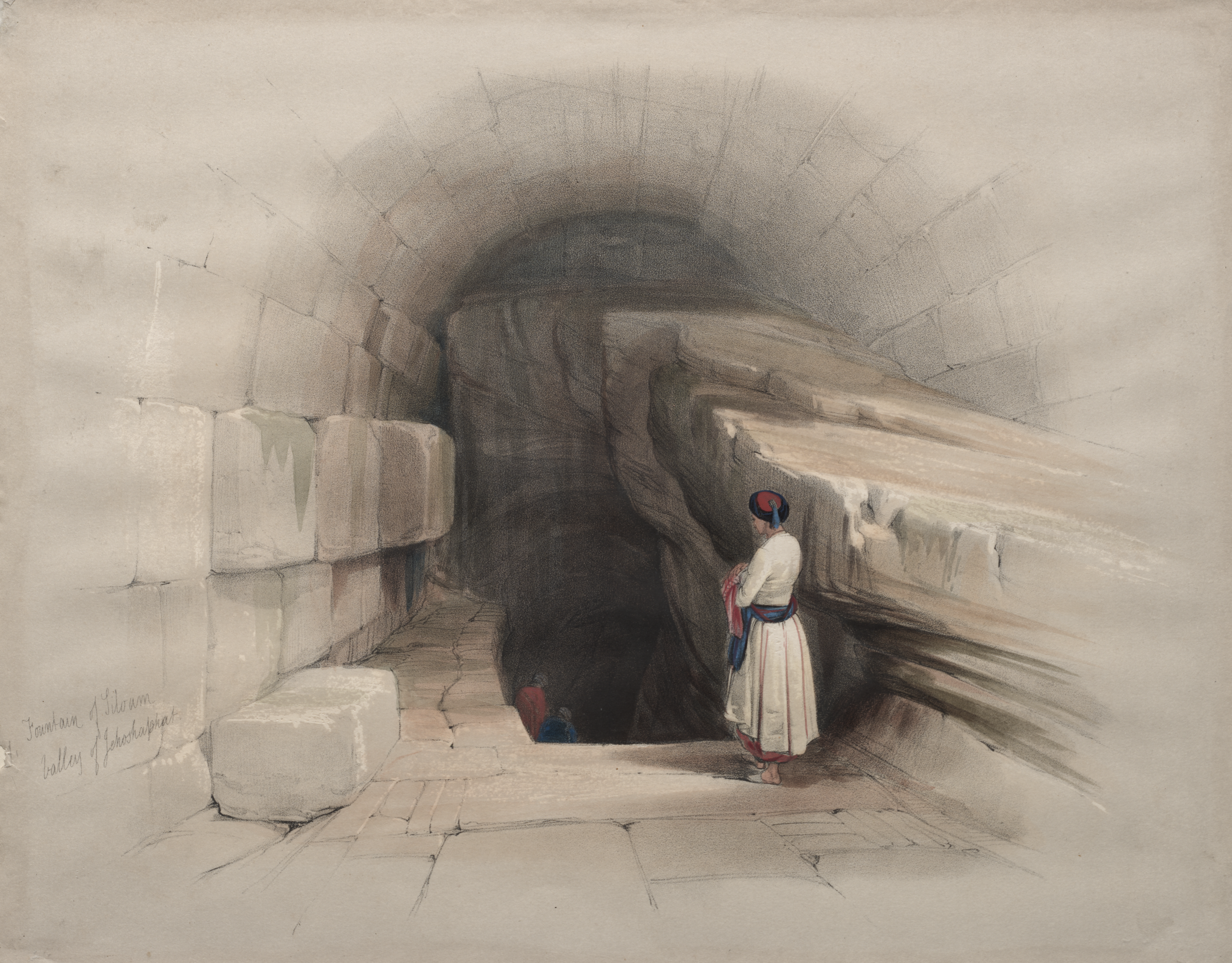
17. Upper Fountain of Siloam

18. Jerusalem, from the Mount of Olives.

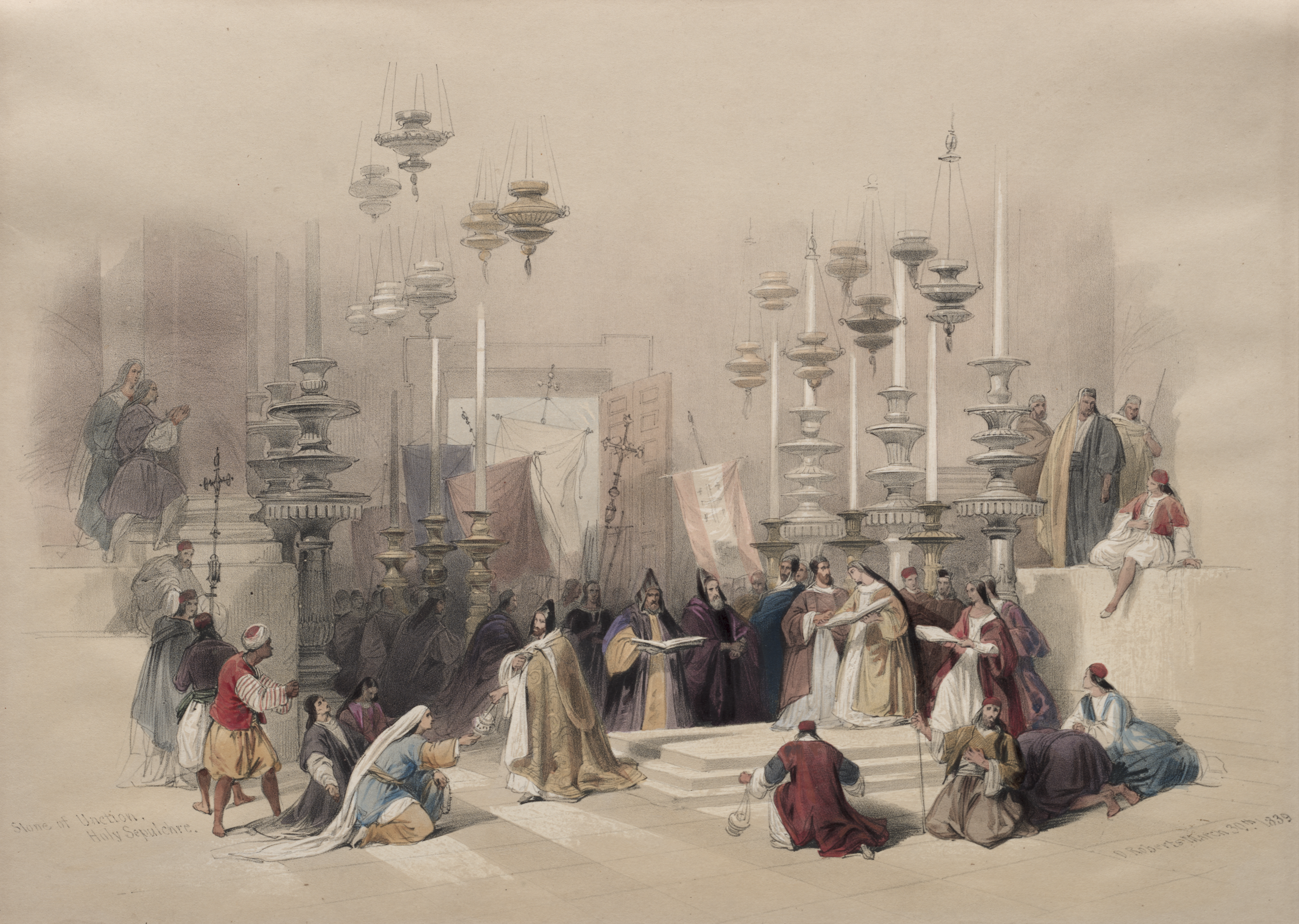
19. The Stone of Unction

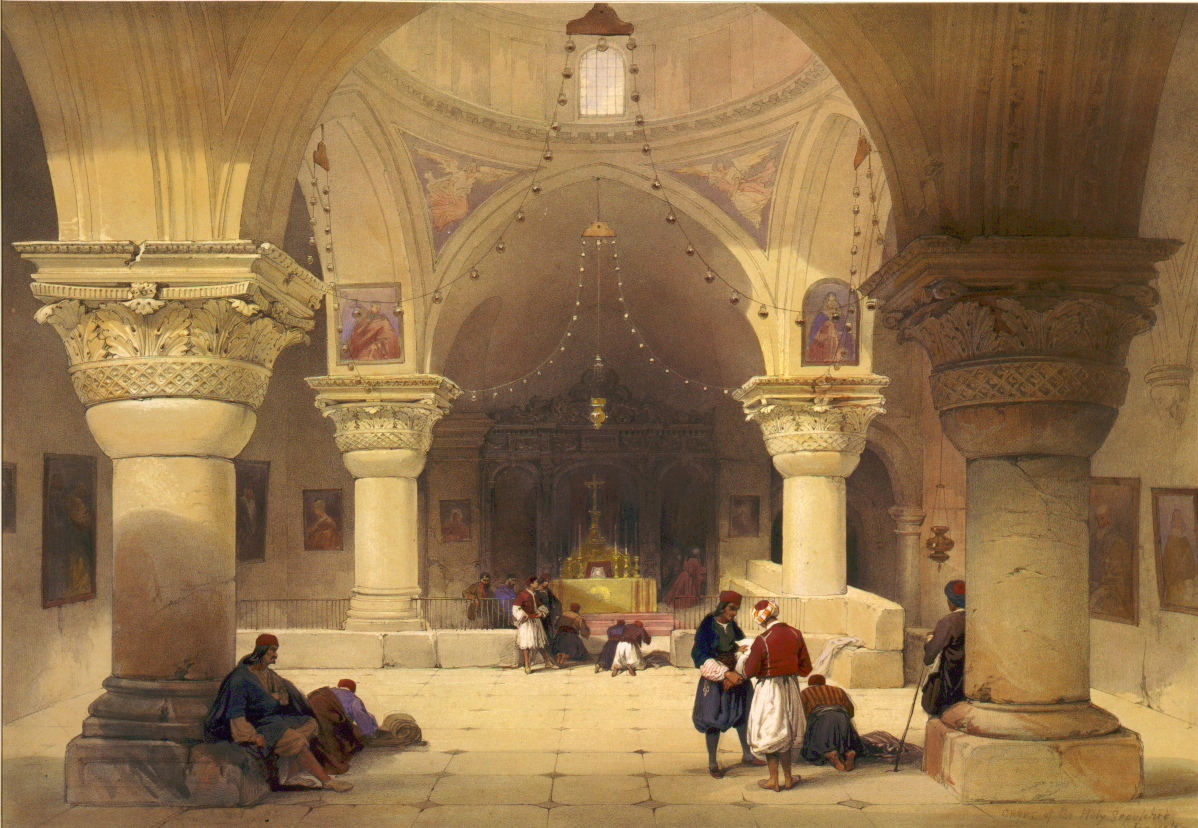
20. Chapel of St. Helena

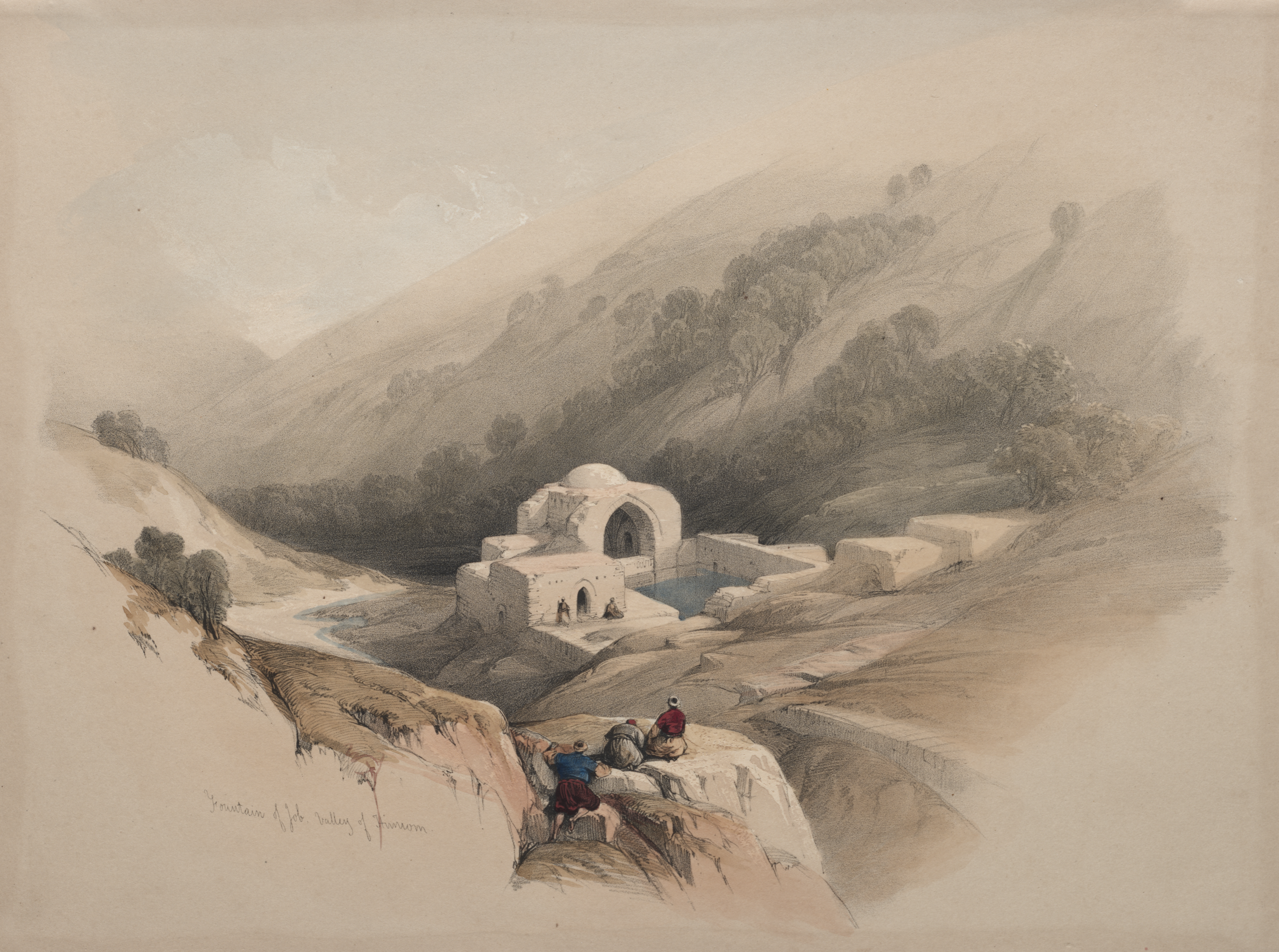
21. The Fountain of Job

22. Jerusalem, from the North.

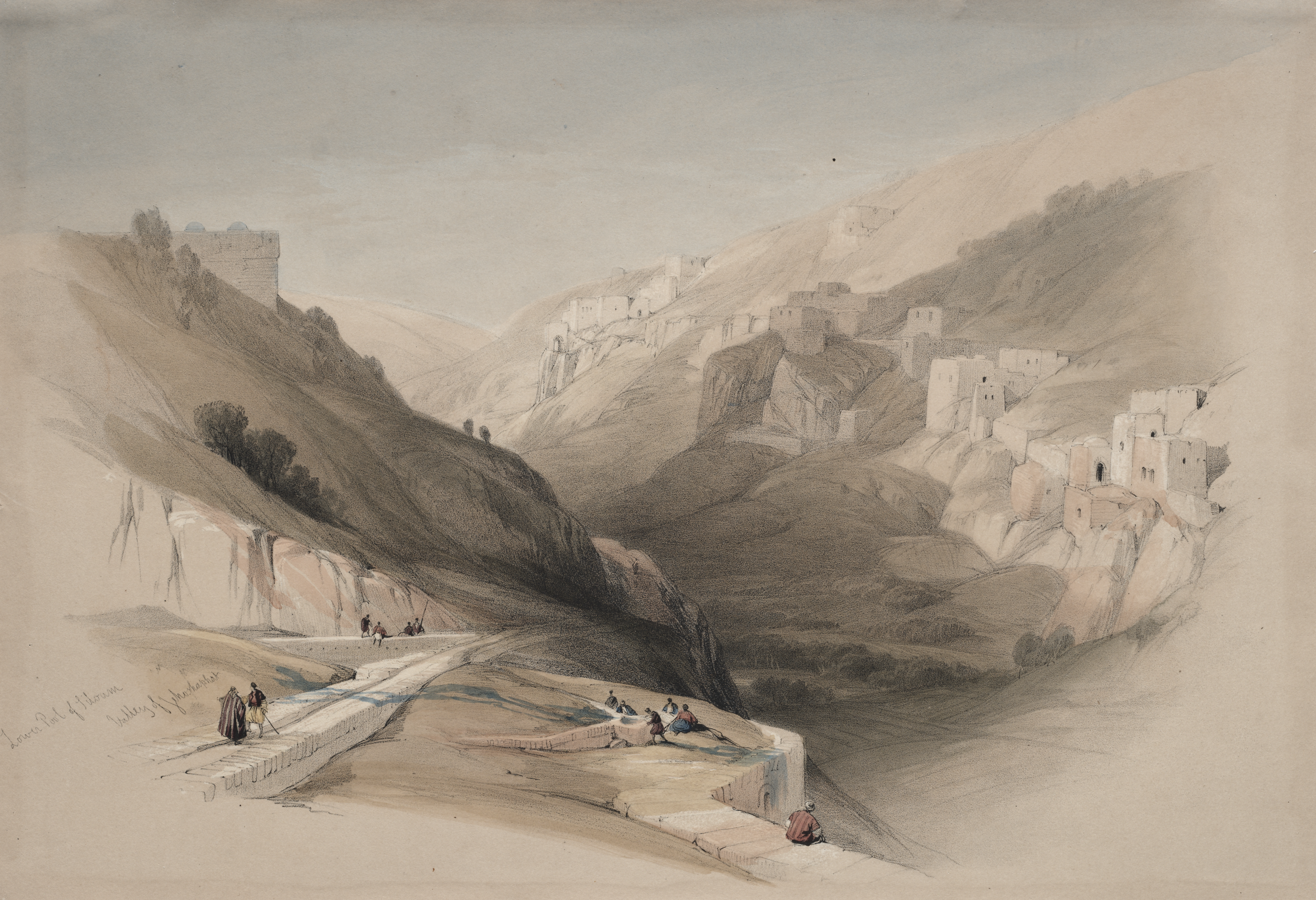
23. Lower Pool of Siloam

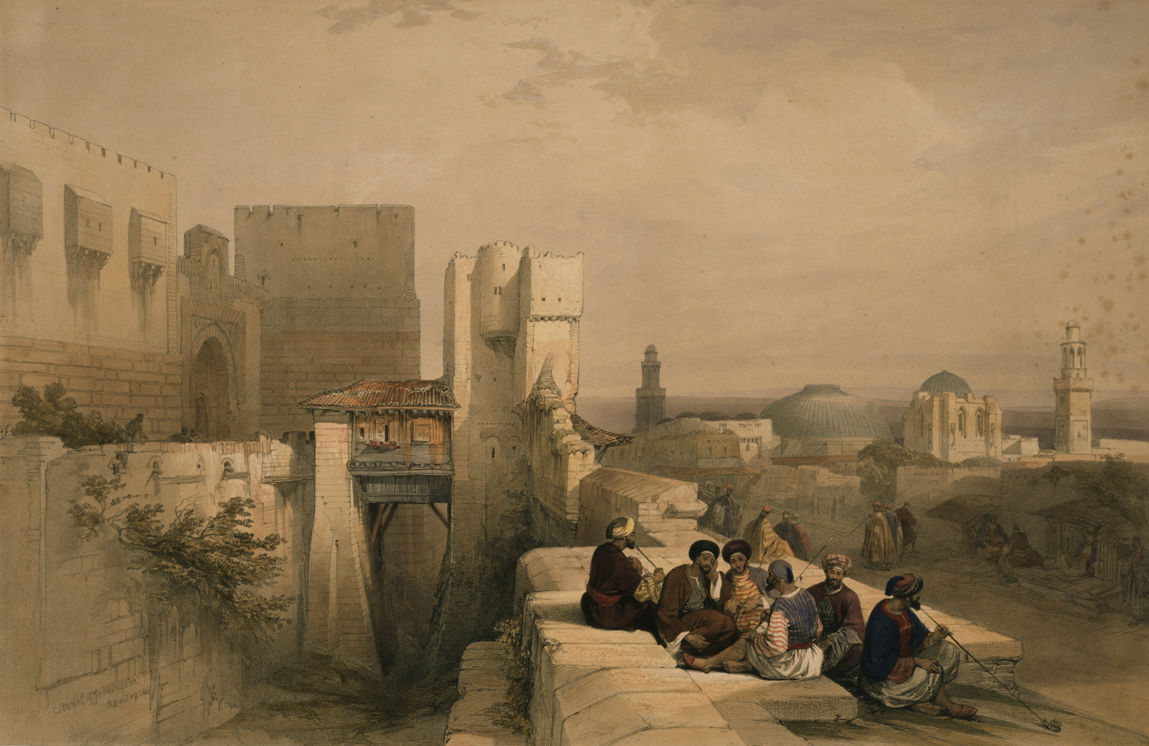
24. Entrance to the Citadel of Jerusalem.

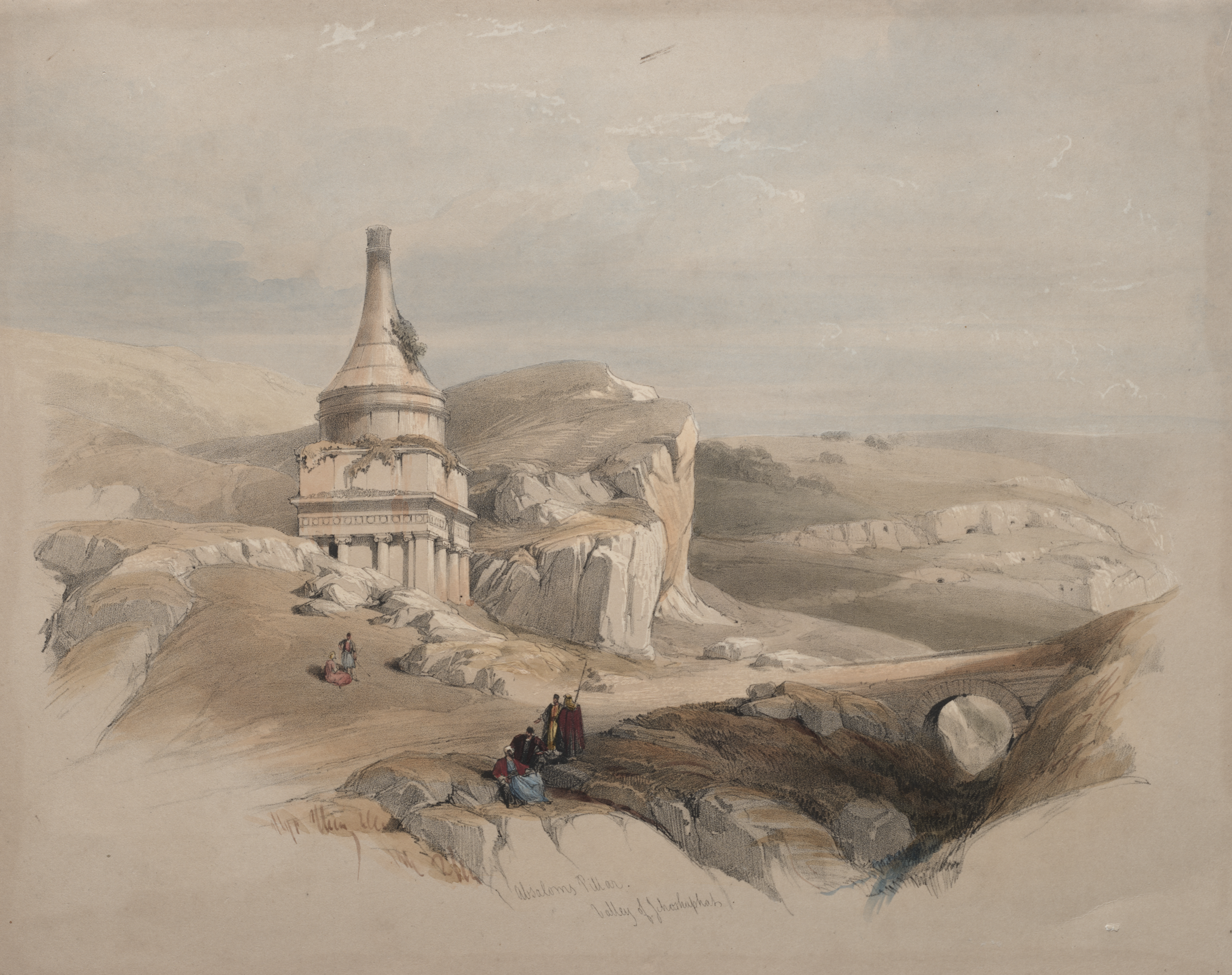
25. The Pillar of Absalom

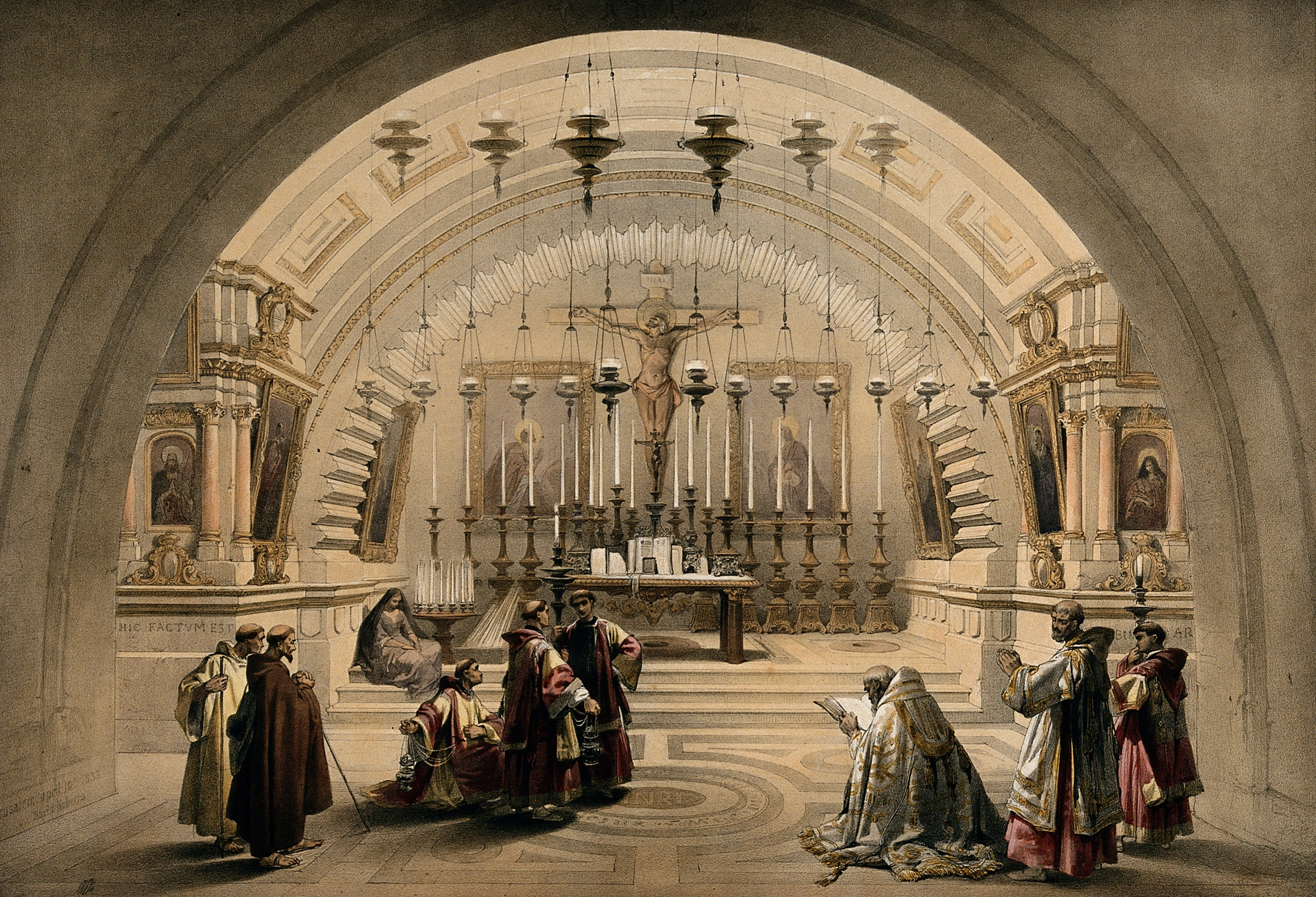
26. Calvary

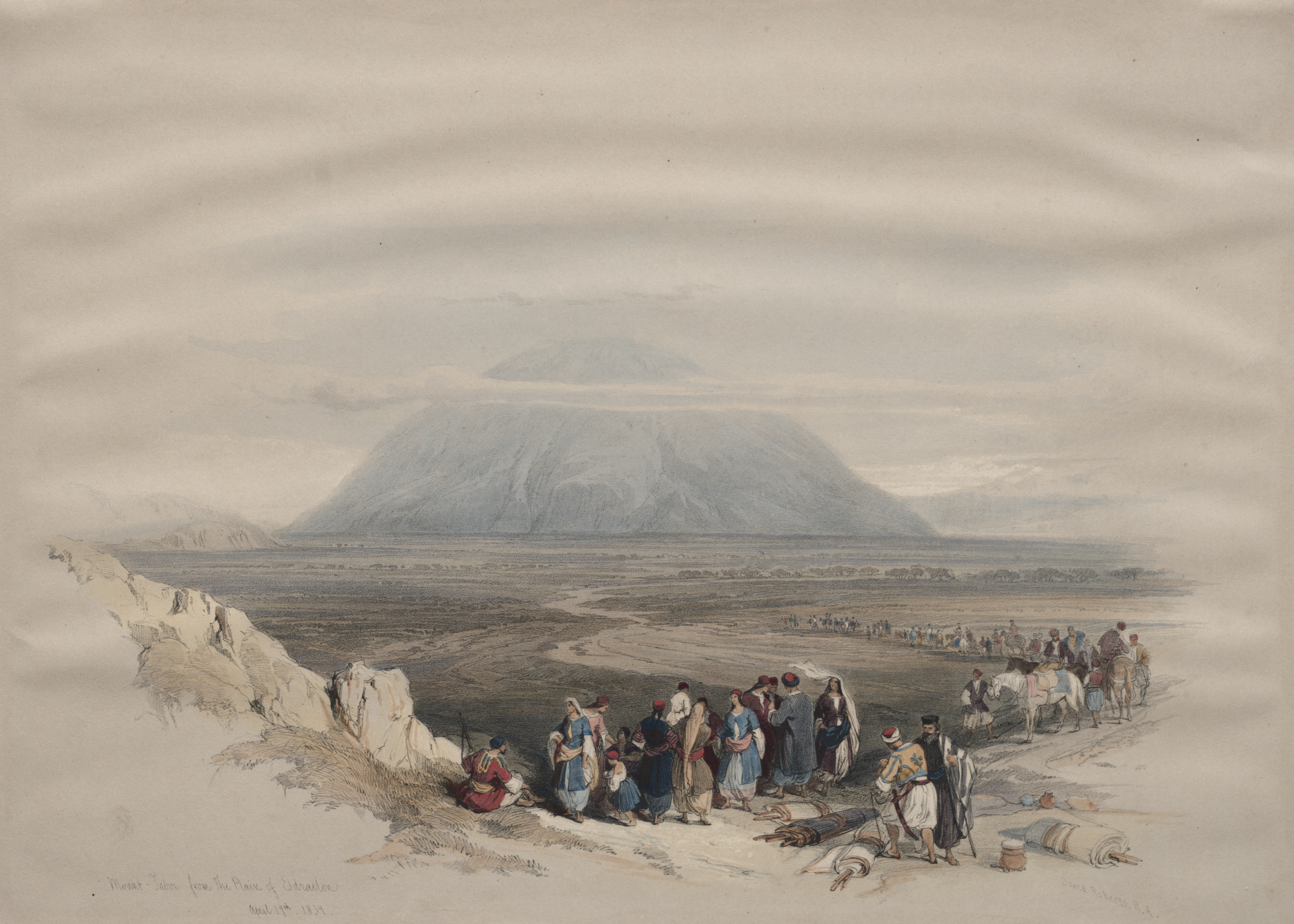
27. Mount Tabor

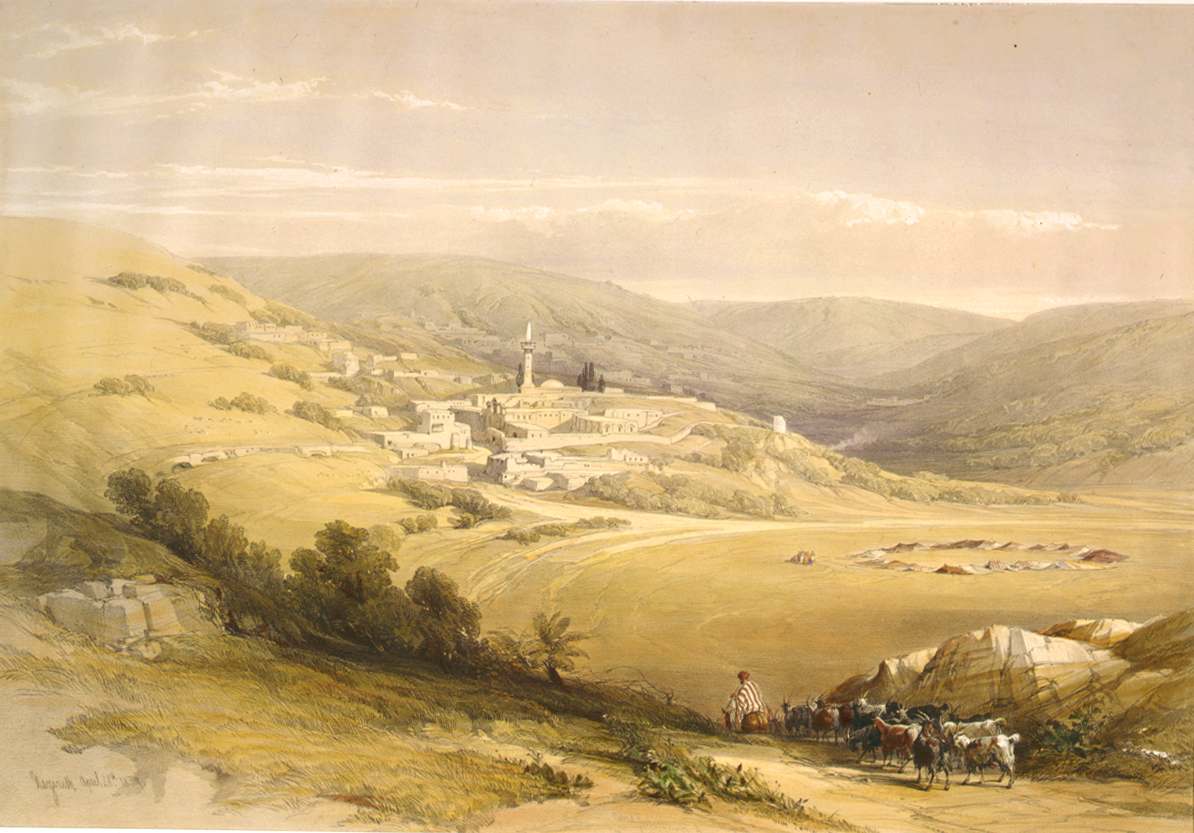
28. General View of Nazareth

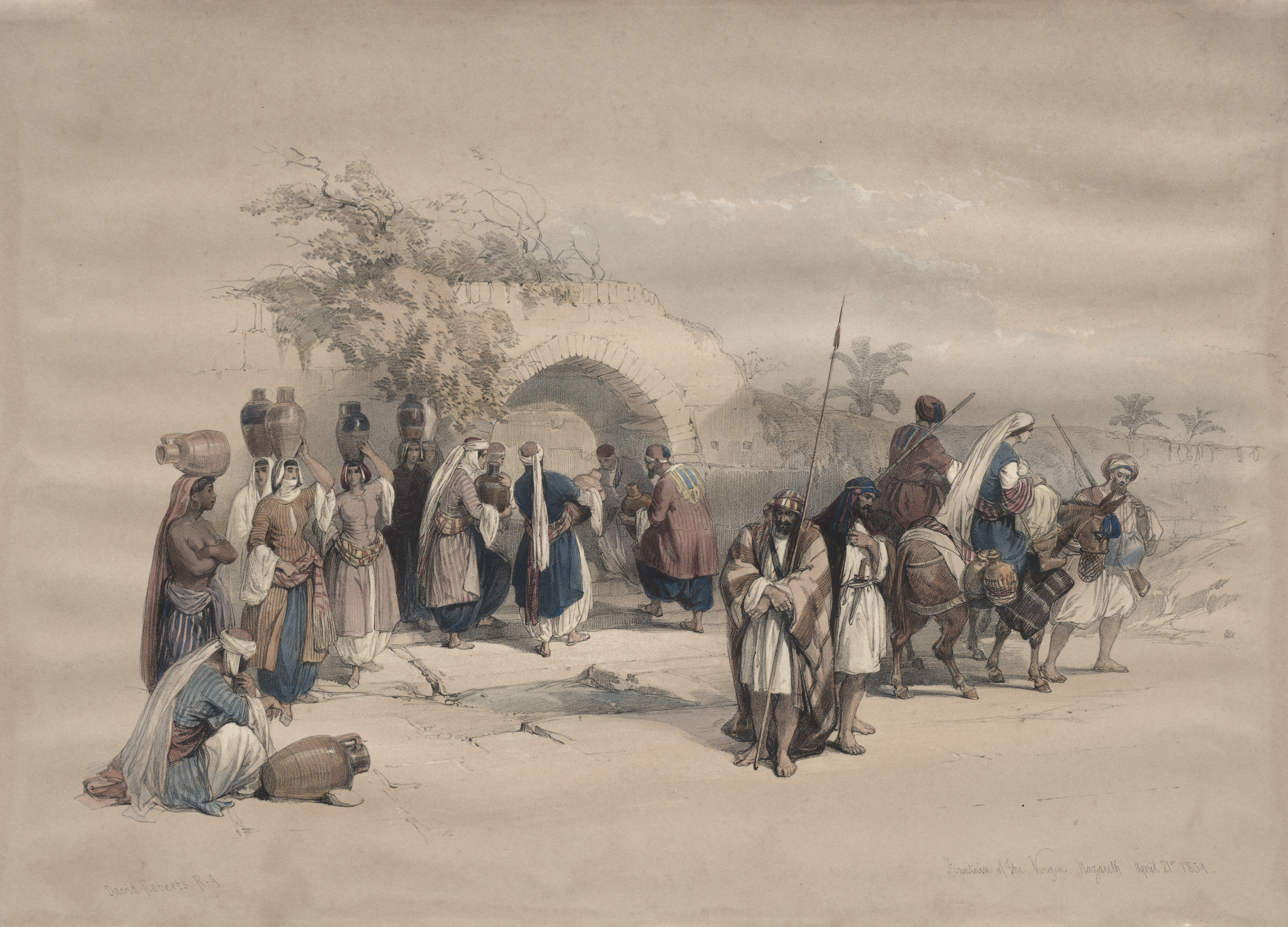
29. Fountain of the Virgin, Nazareth.

30. Convent of the Terra Santa, Nazareth.

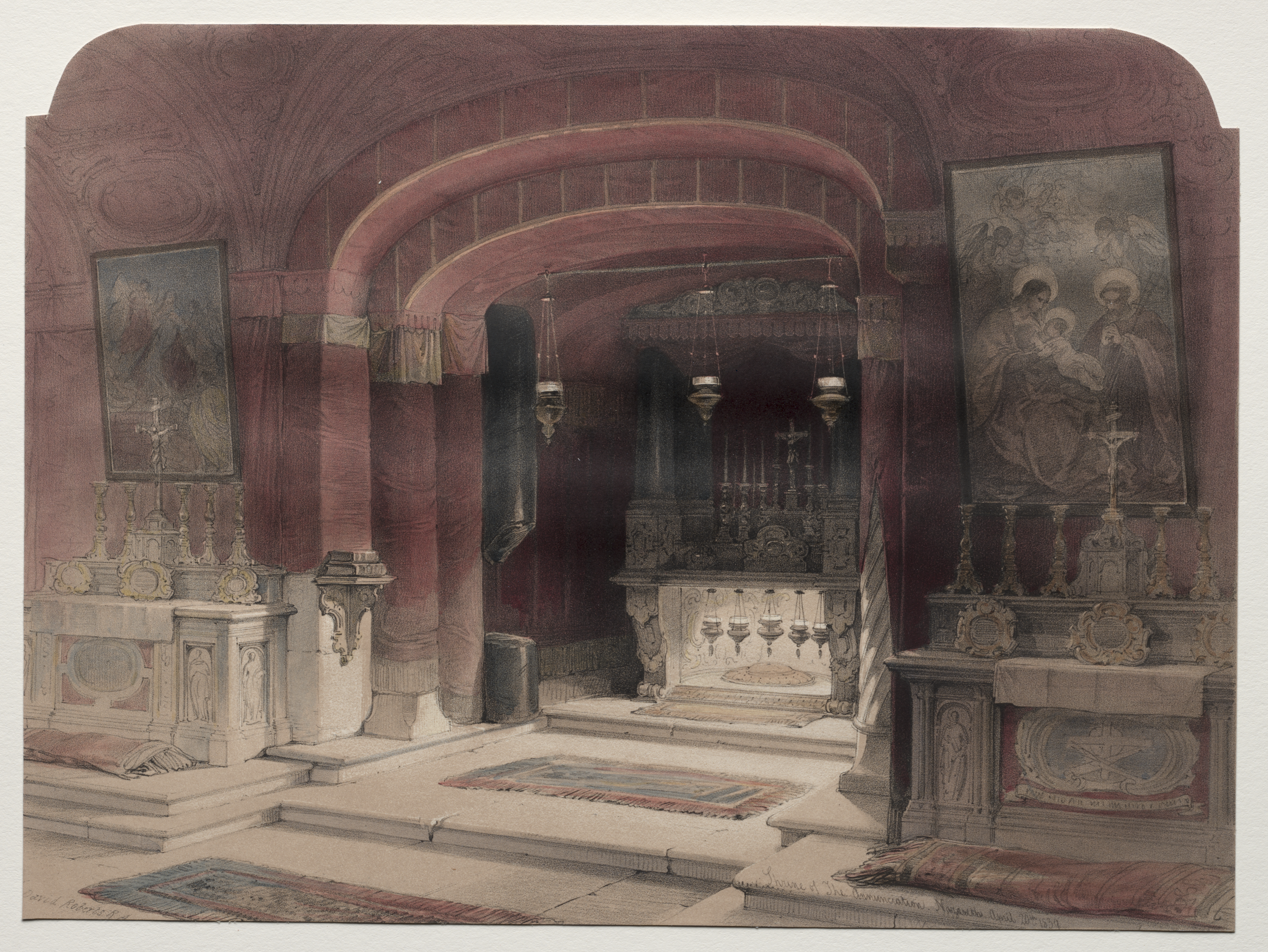
31. Shrine of the Annunciation, Nazareth.

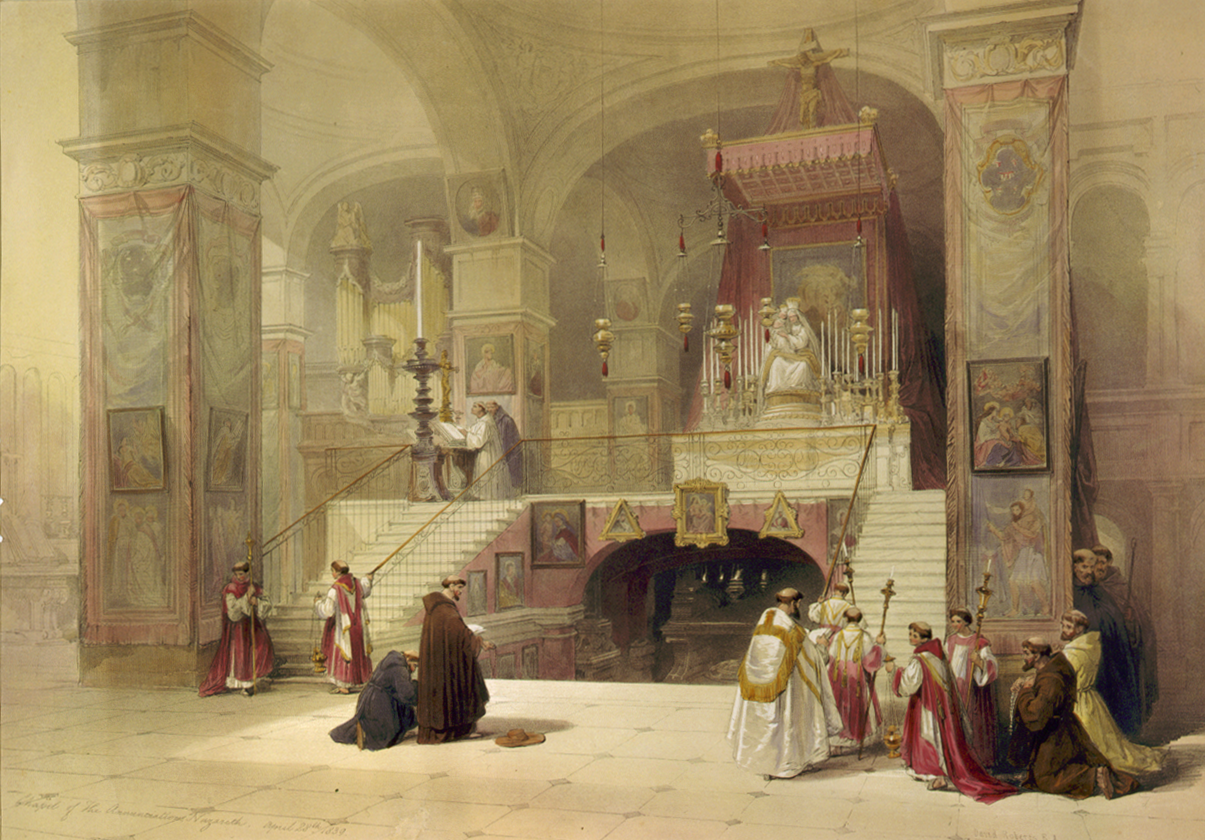
32. Church of the Annunciation, Nazareth.

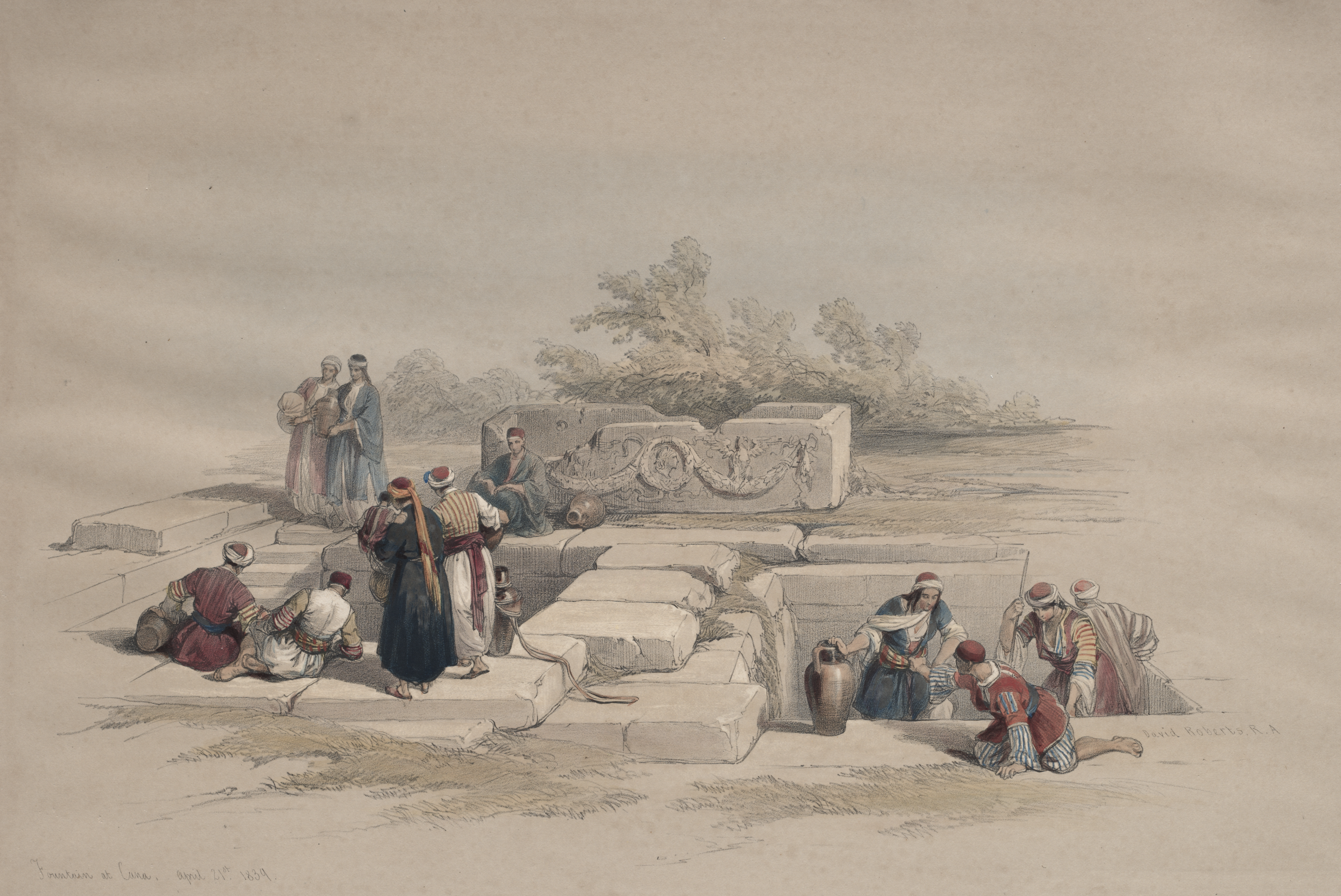
33. The Fountain of Cana.

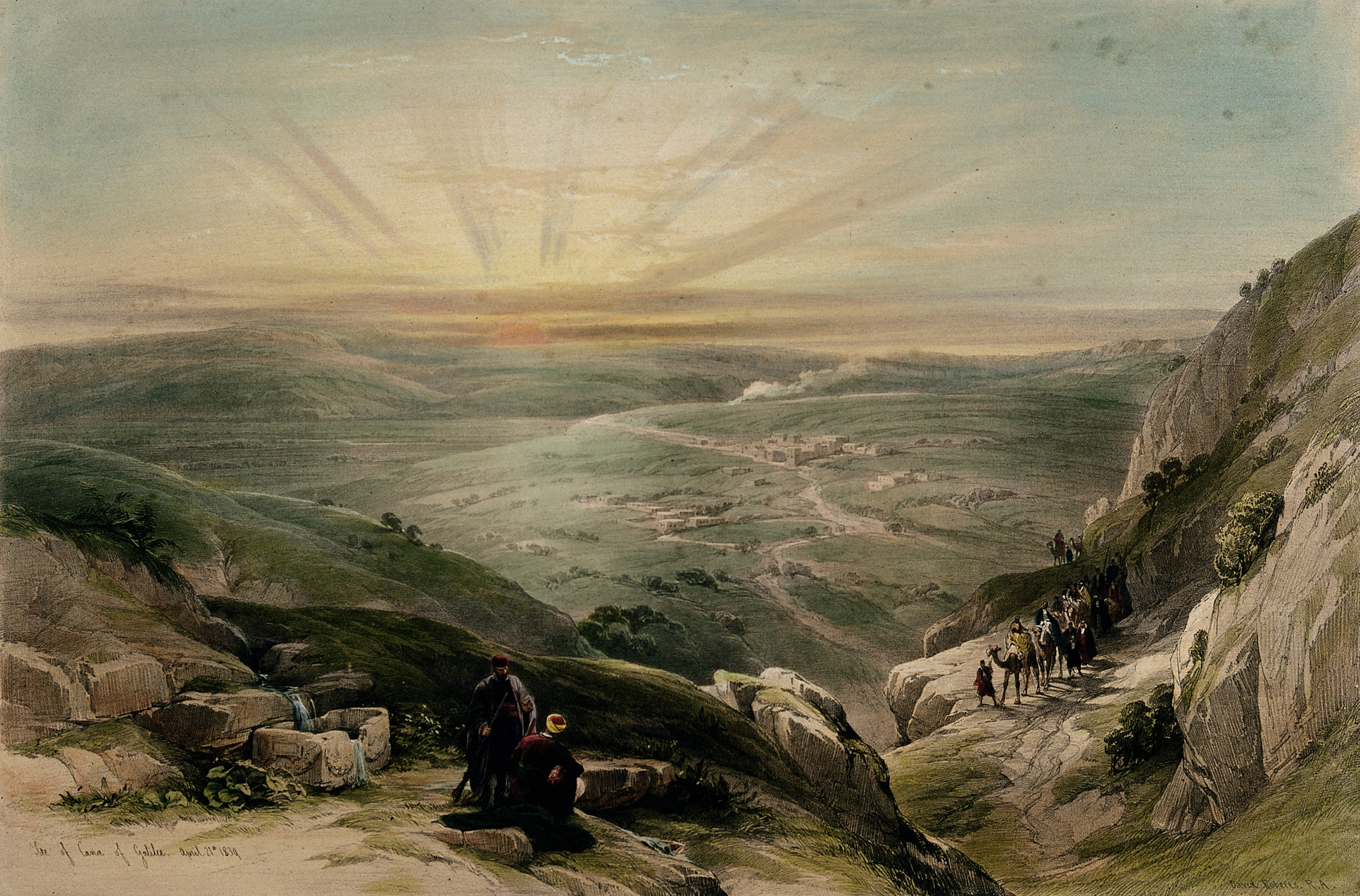
34. Cana. General View.

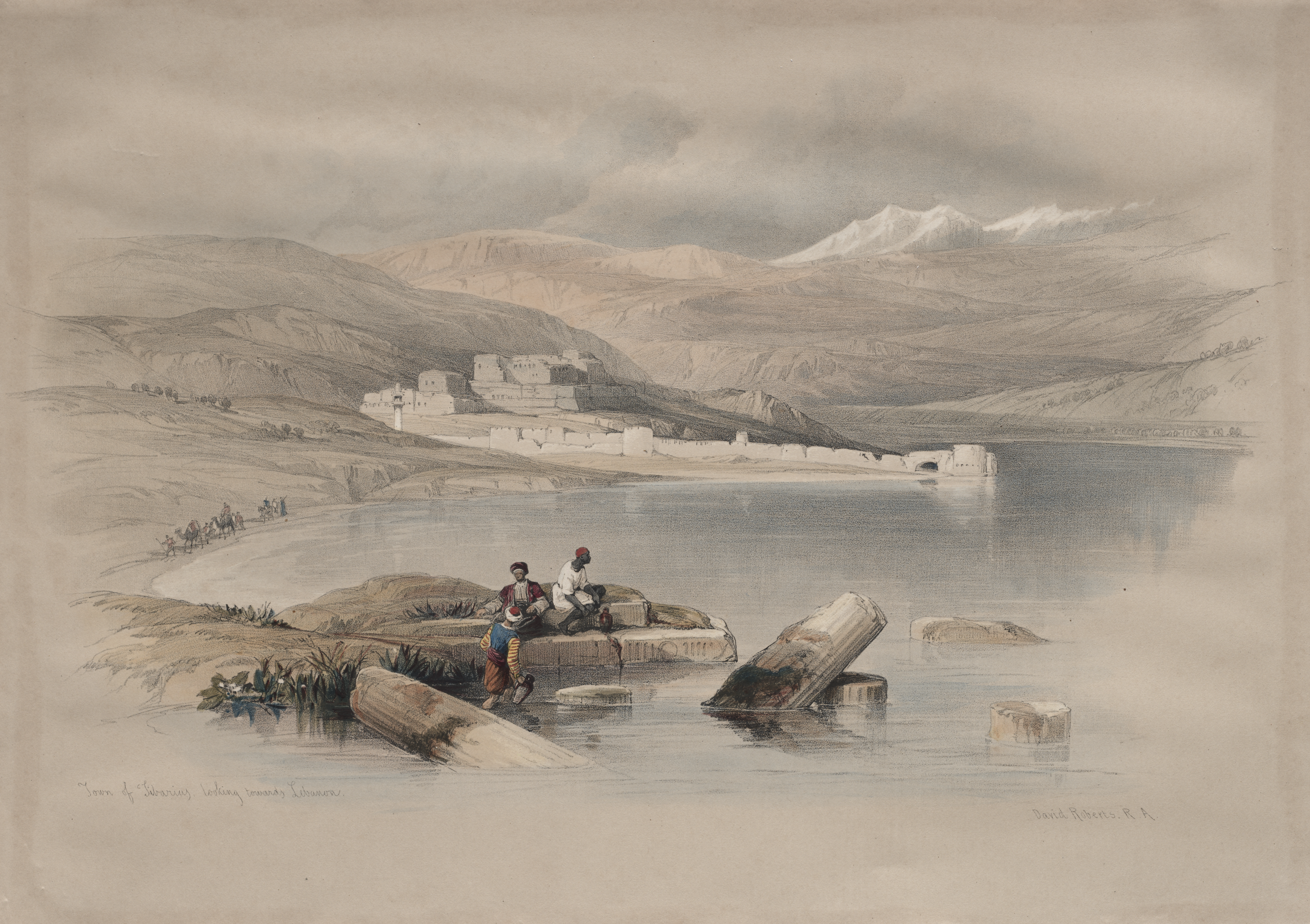
35. Town of Tiberias, looking towards Lebanon.

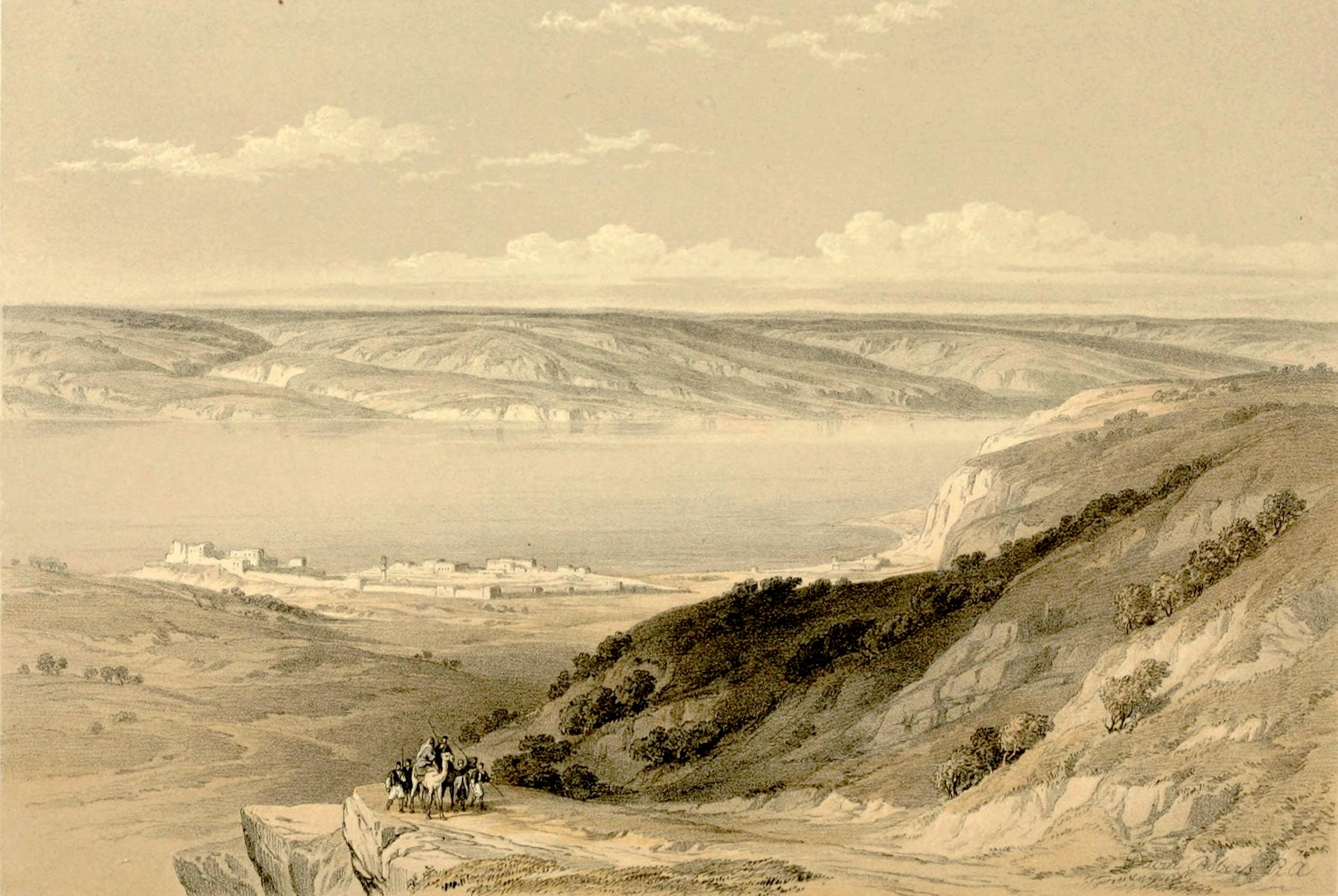
36. The Sea of Tiberias, looking towards Bashan.

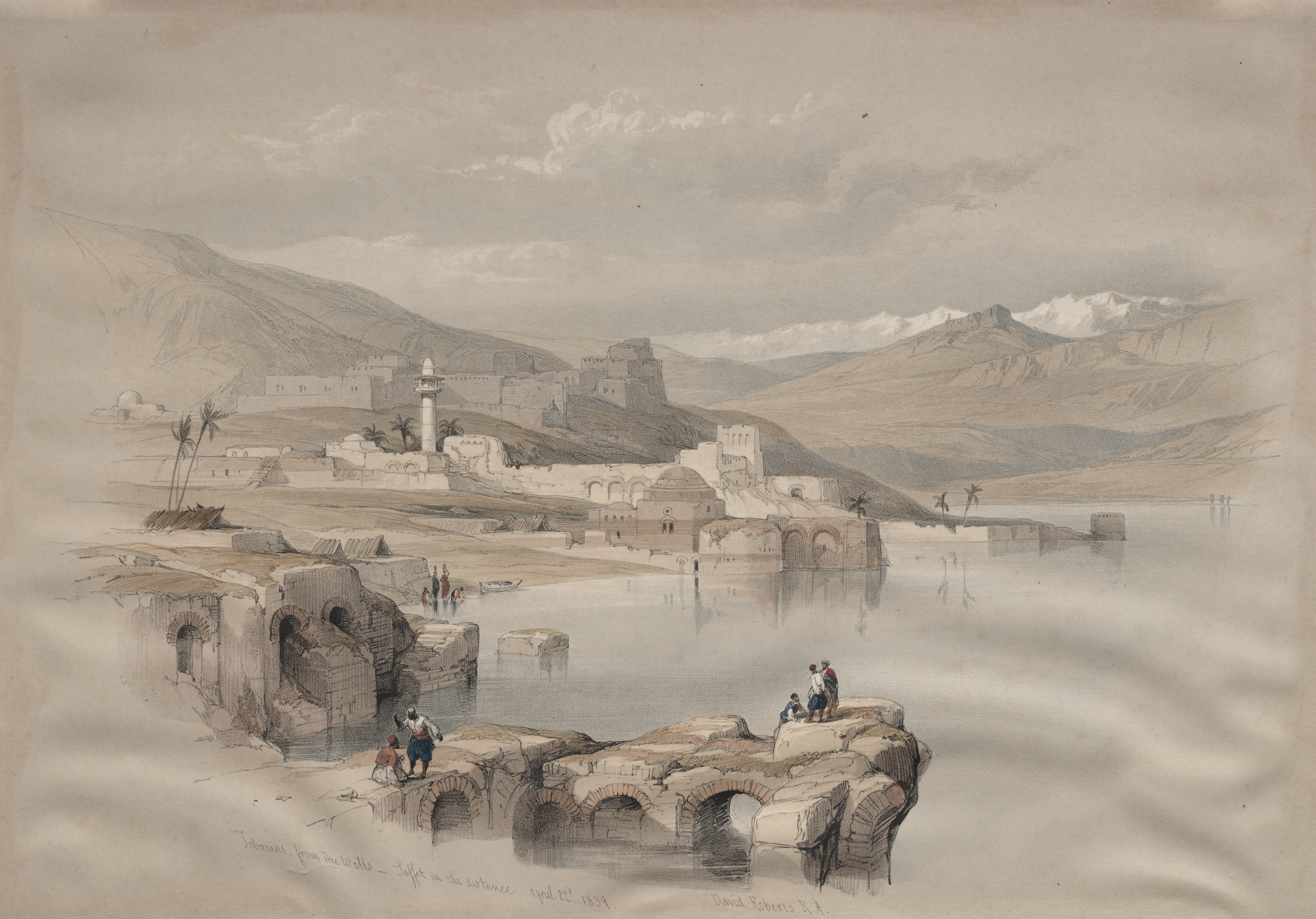
37. Tiberias, from the Walls; Safed in the distance.

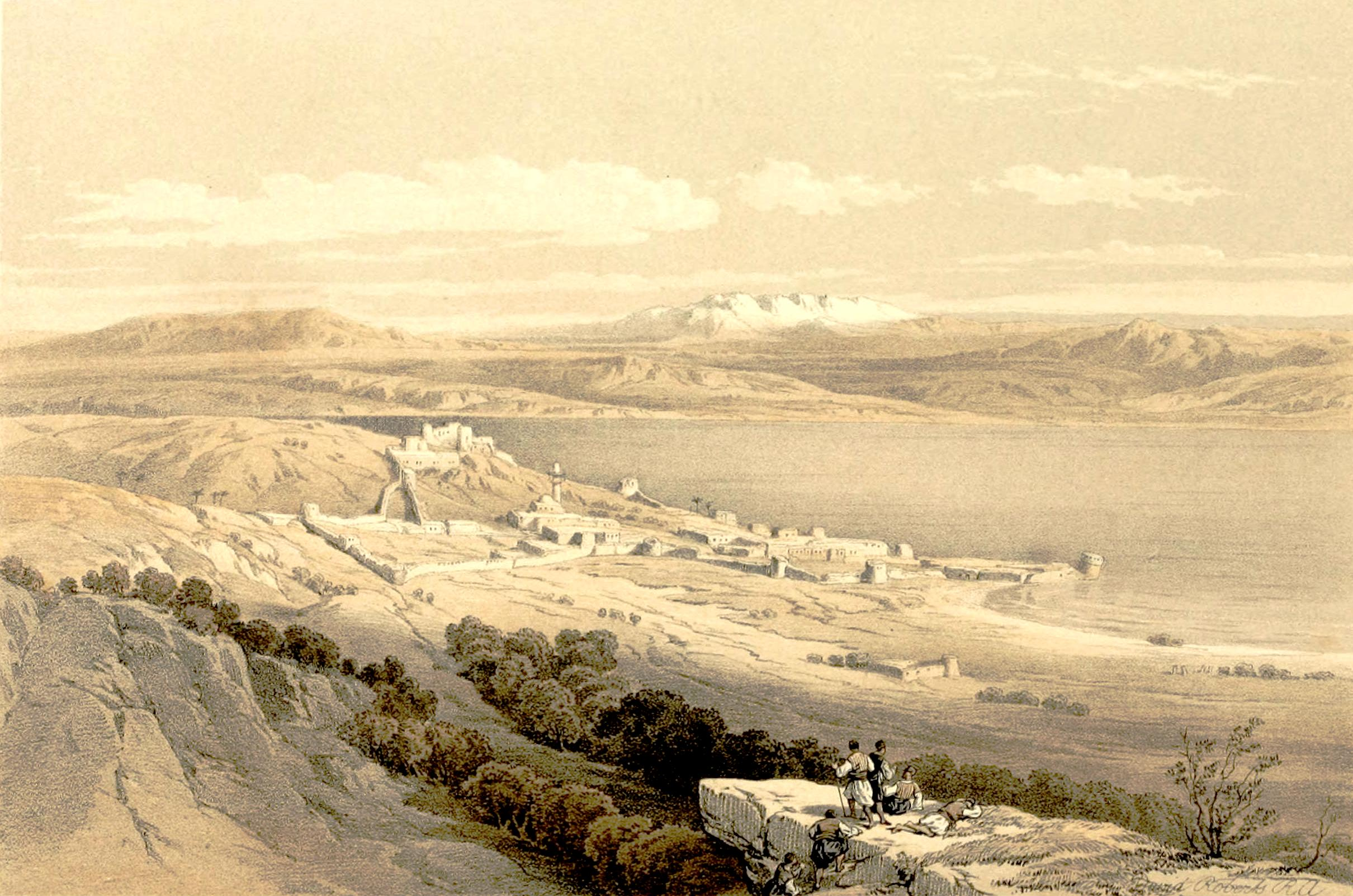
38. Tiberias, looking towards Hermon.

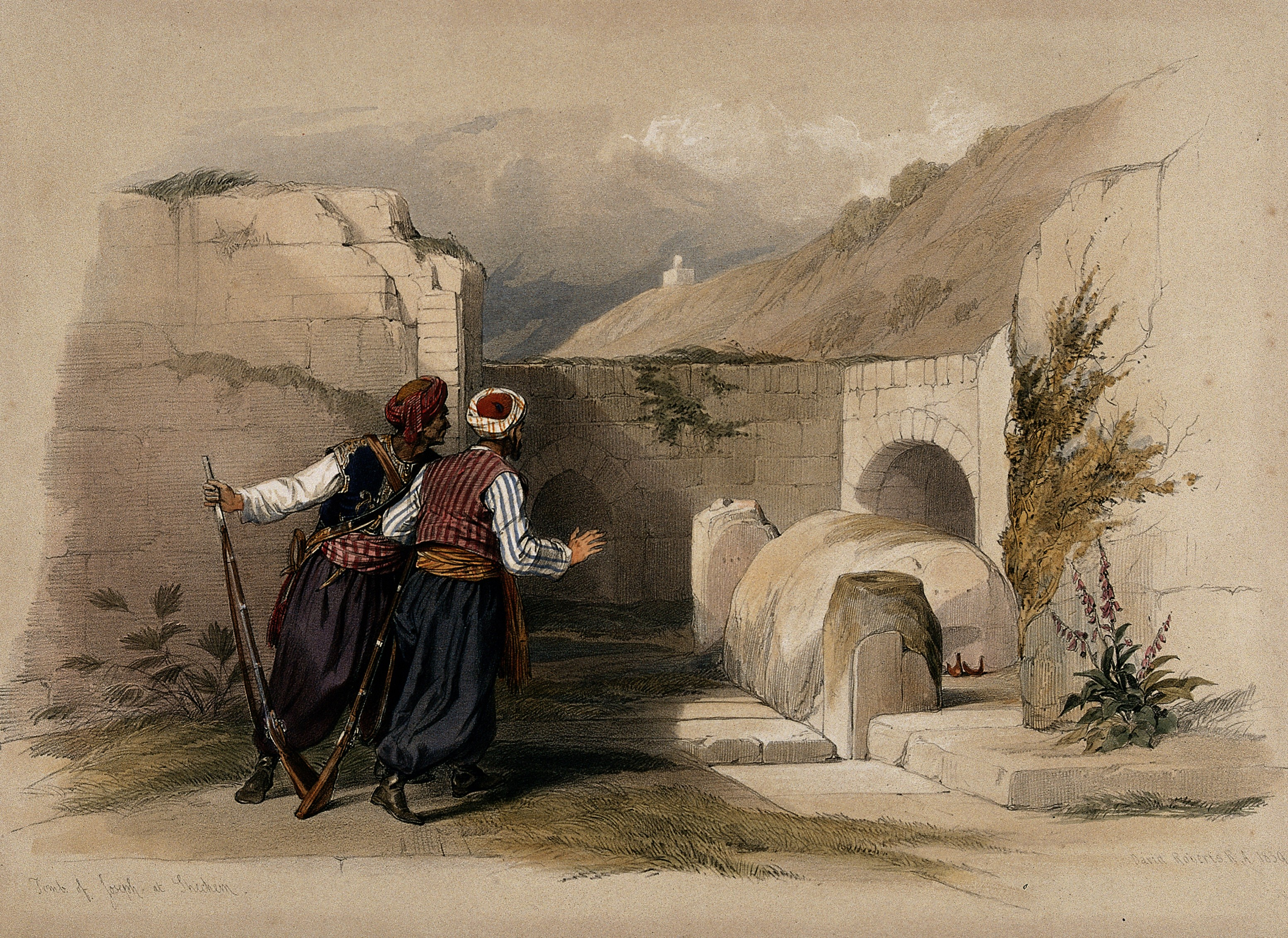
39. The Tomb of Joseph, at Shechem.

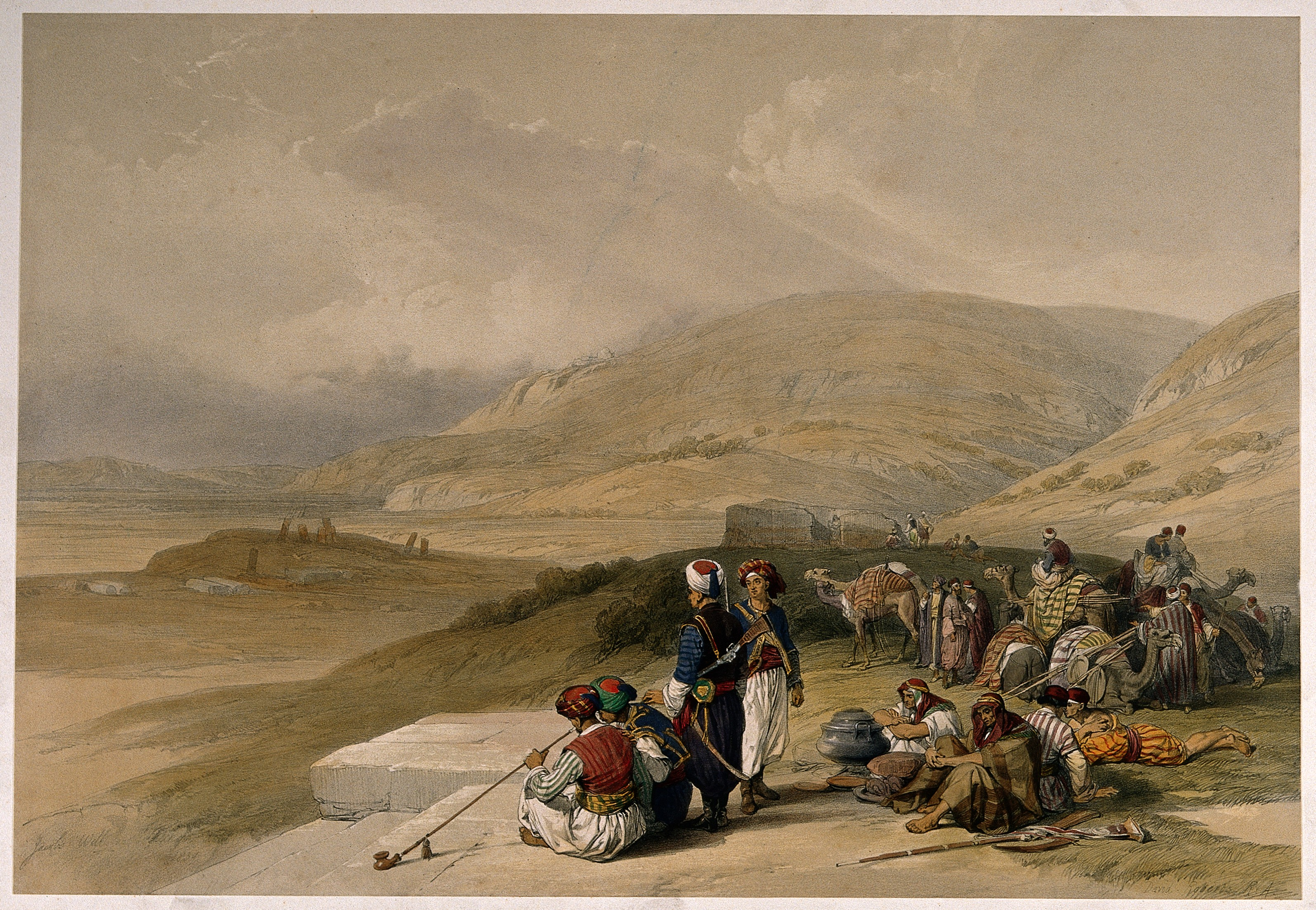
40. Jacob's Well at Shechem.

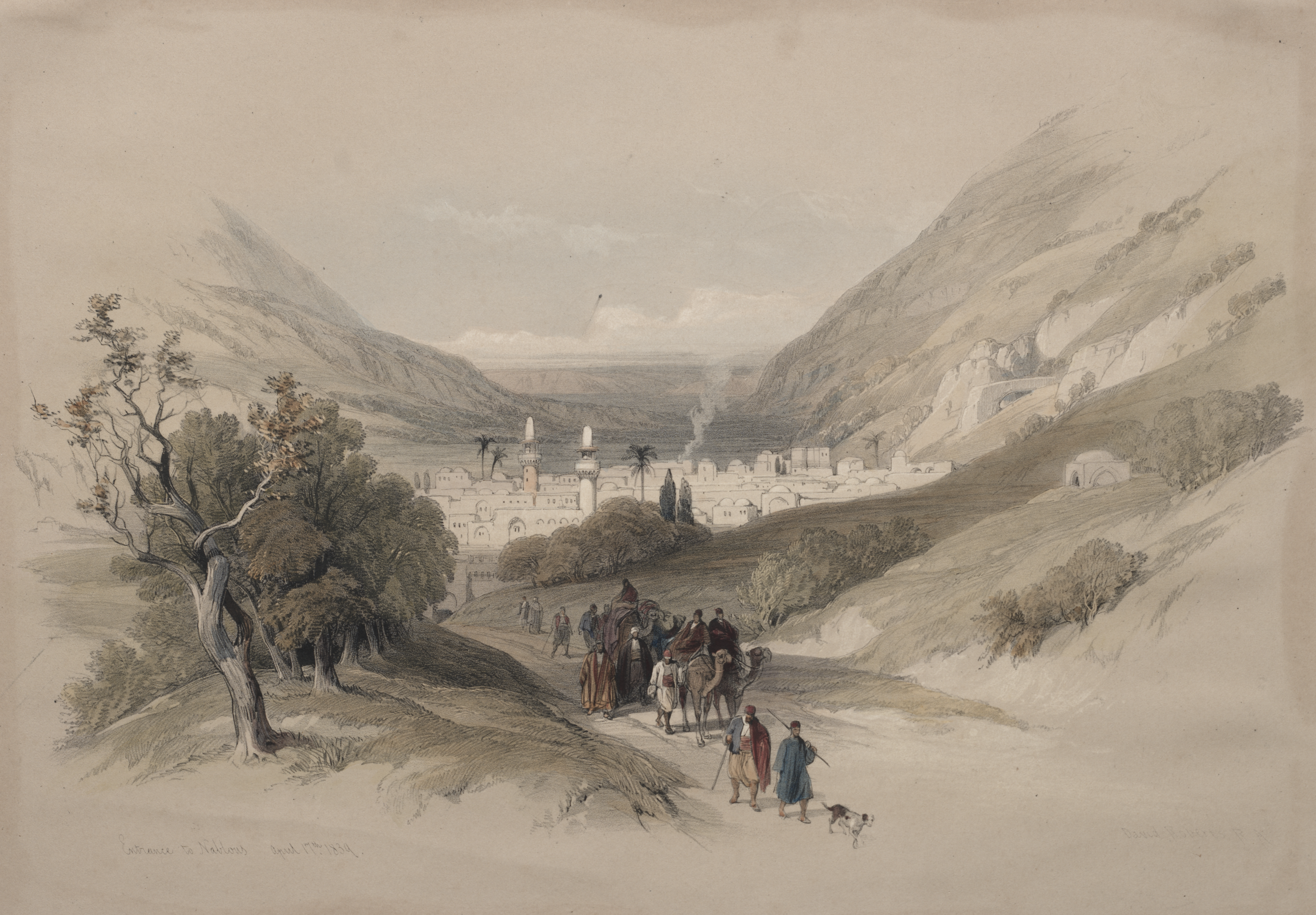
41. Entrance to Nablous.

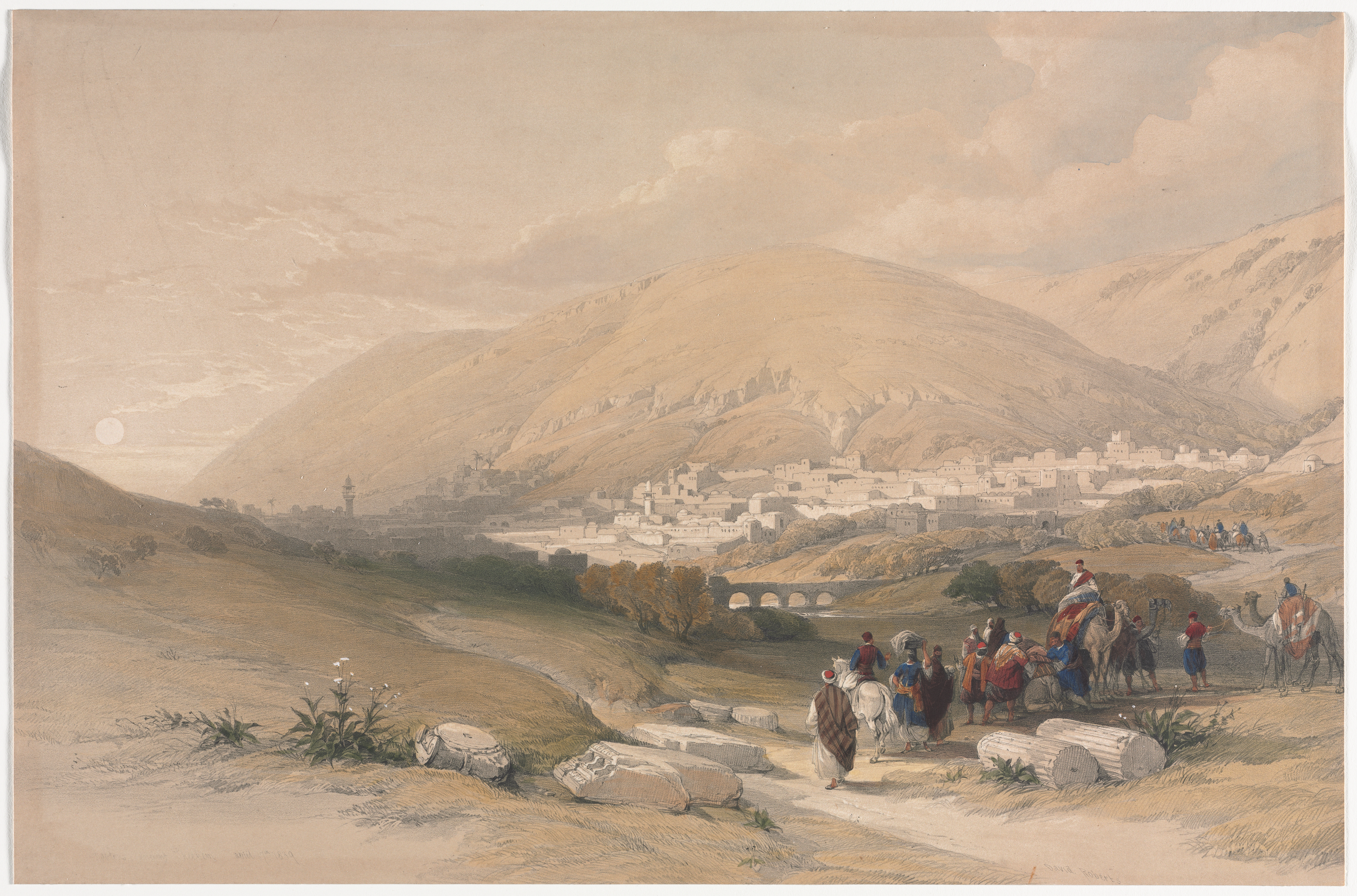
42. Nablous, the ancient Shechem.

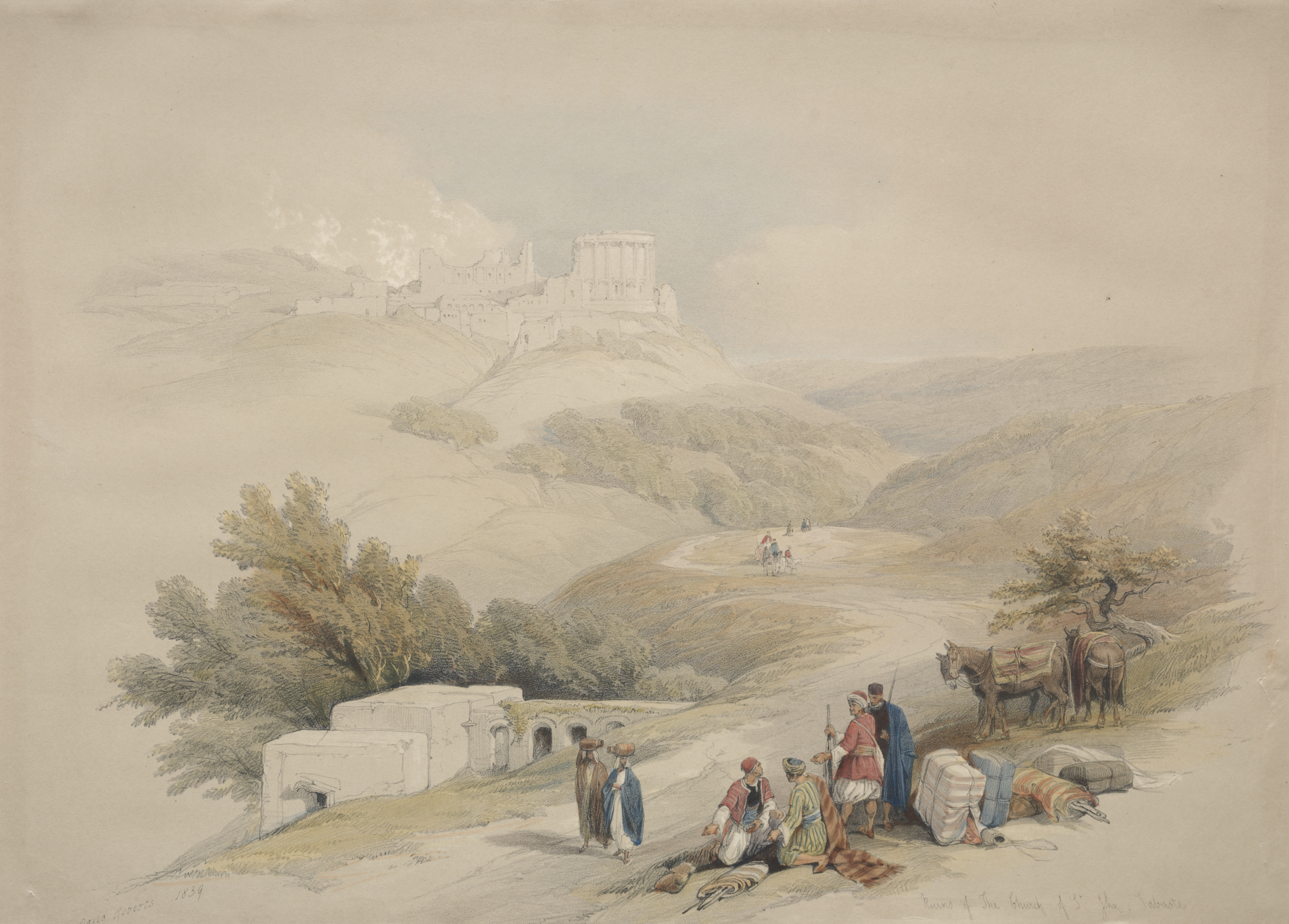
43. Ruins of the Church of St. John, Sebaste.

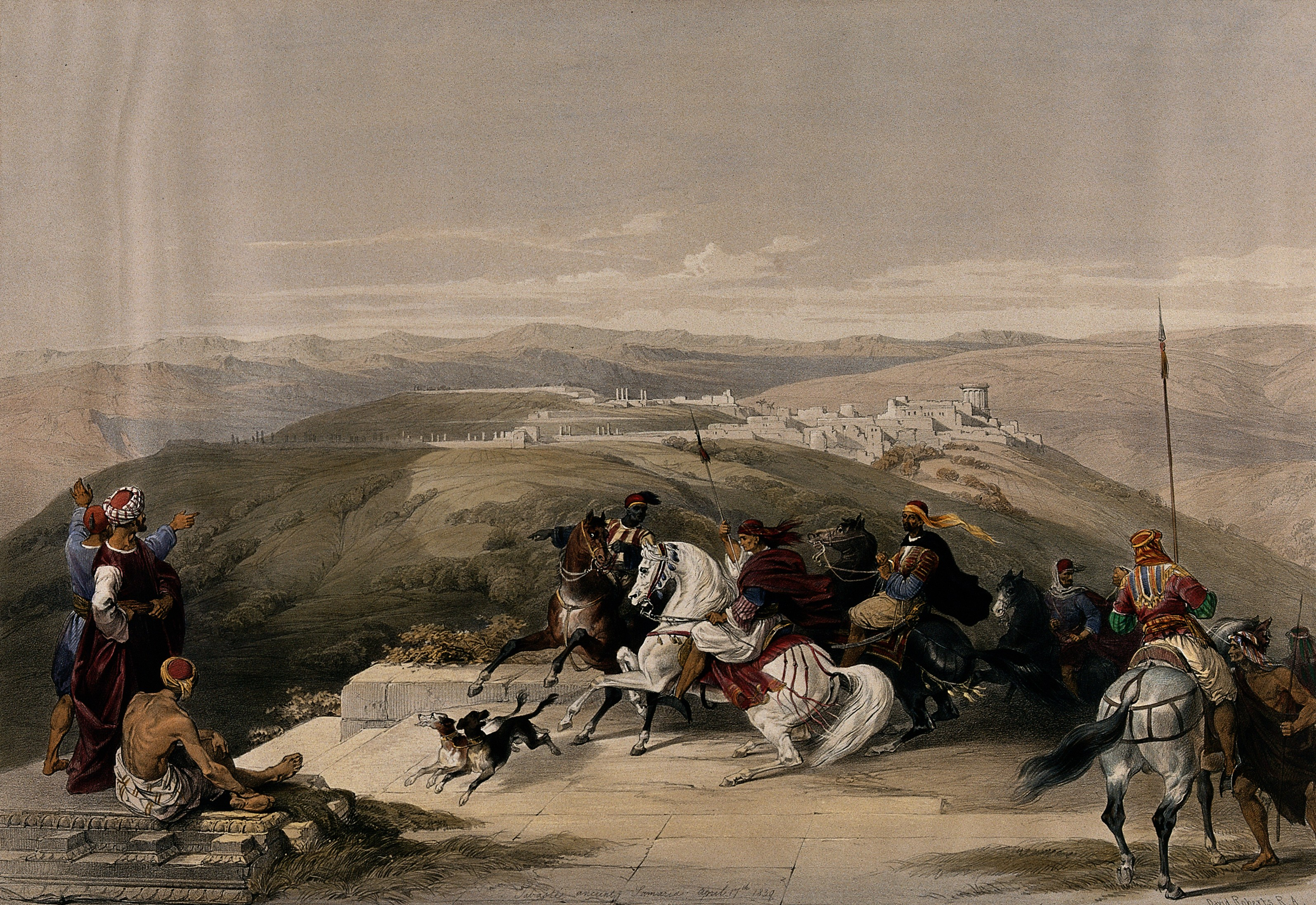
44. Sebaste, ancient Samaria.

=== Volume 2 ===
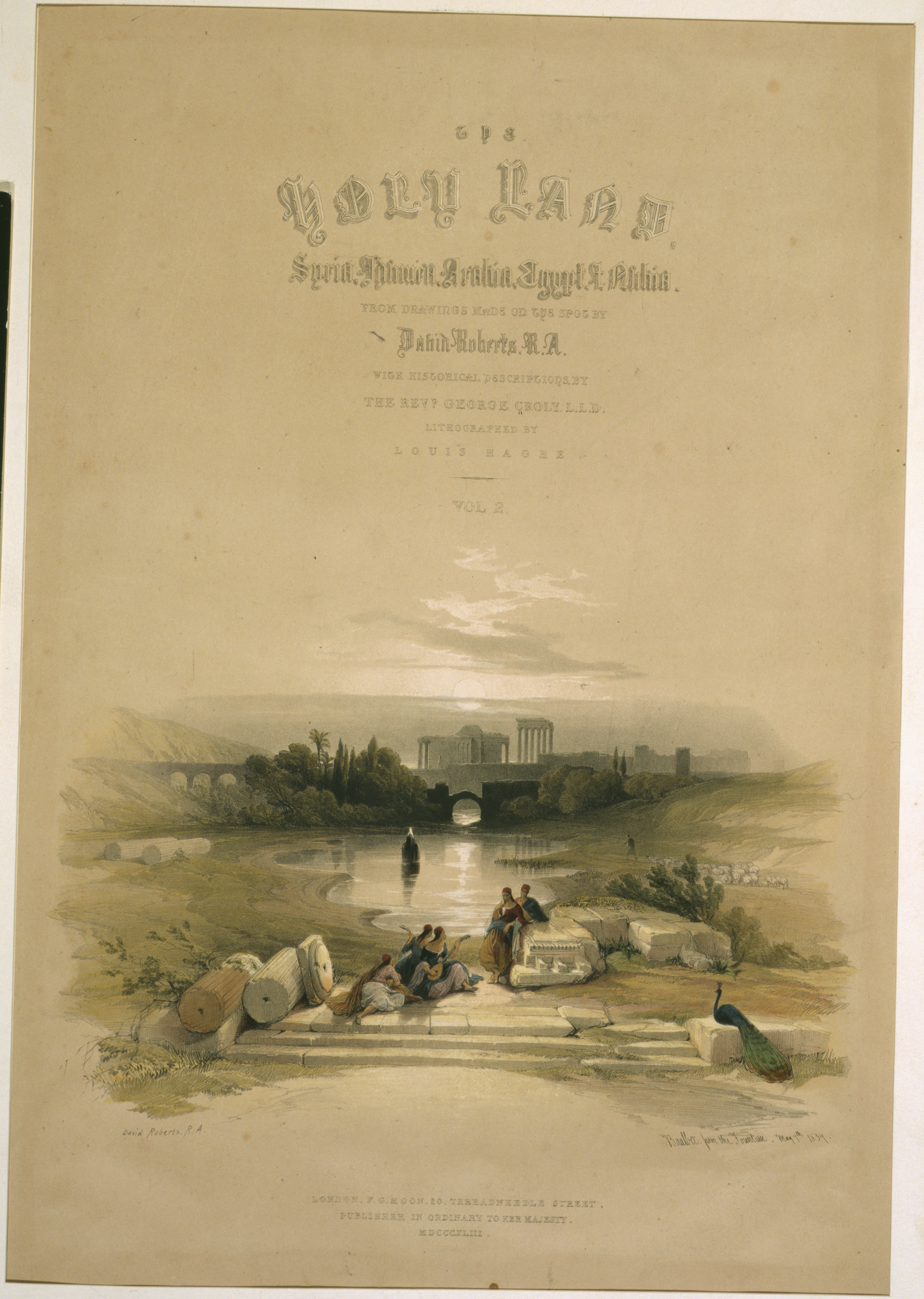
45. Title page. Baalbec, from the Fountain.

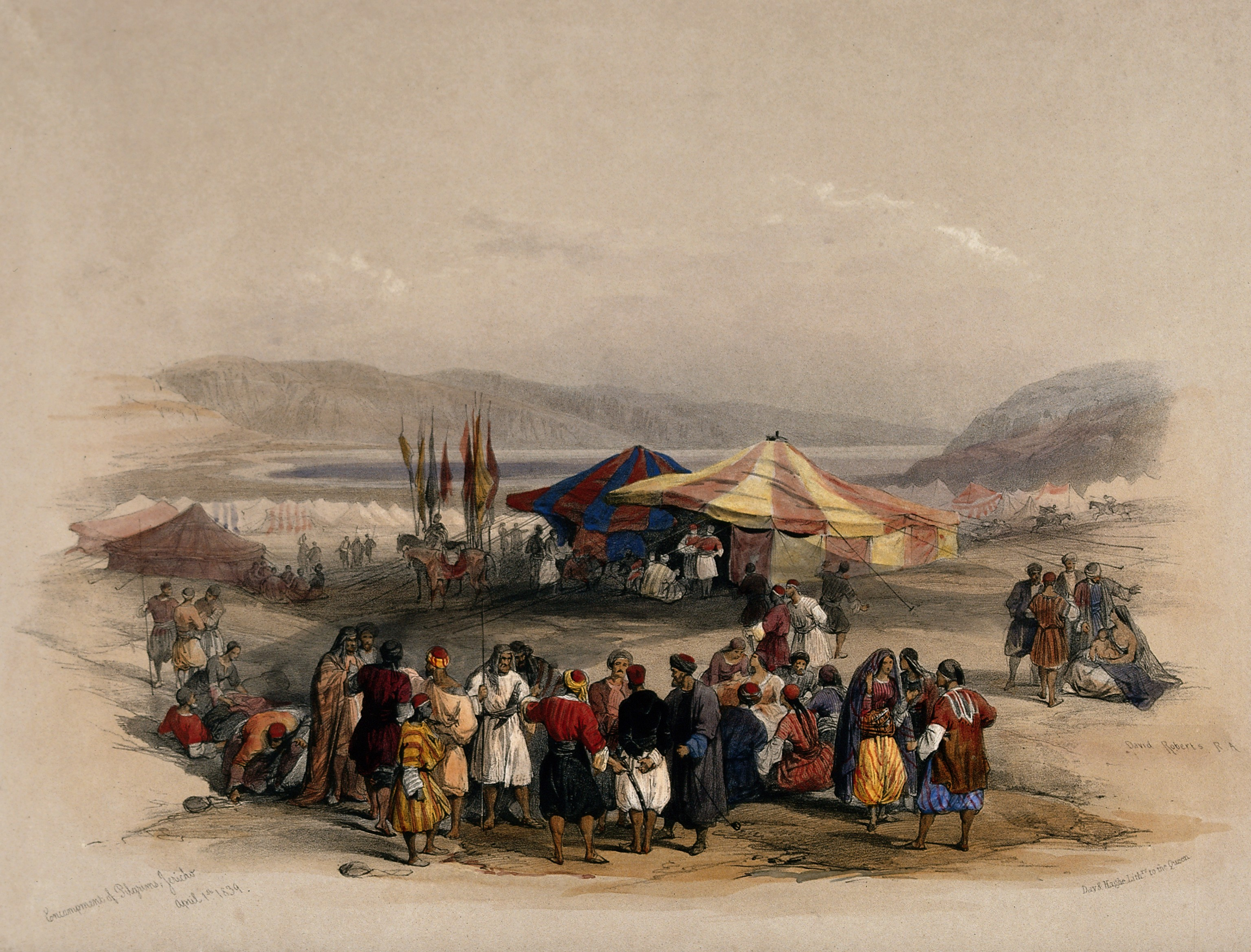
46. Encampment of the Pilgrims at Jericho.

47. Descent upon the Valley of the Jordan.

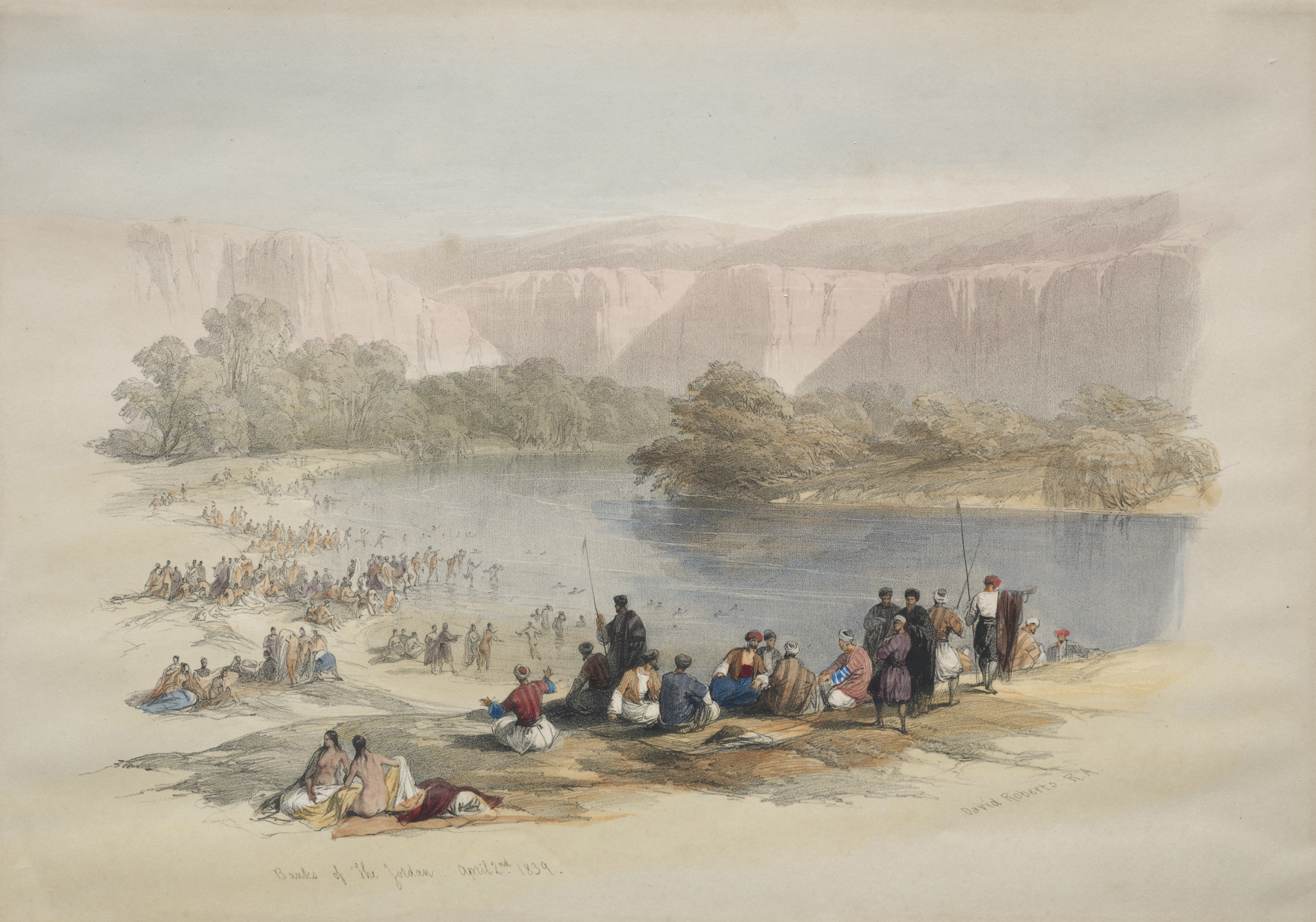
48. The immersion of the Pilgrims.

49. Jericho

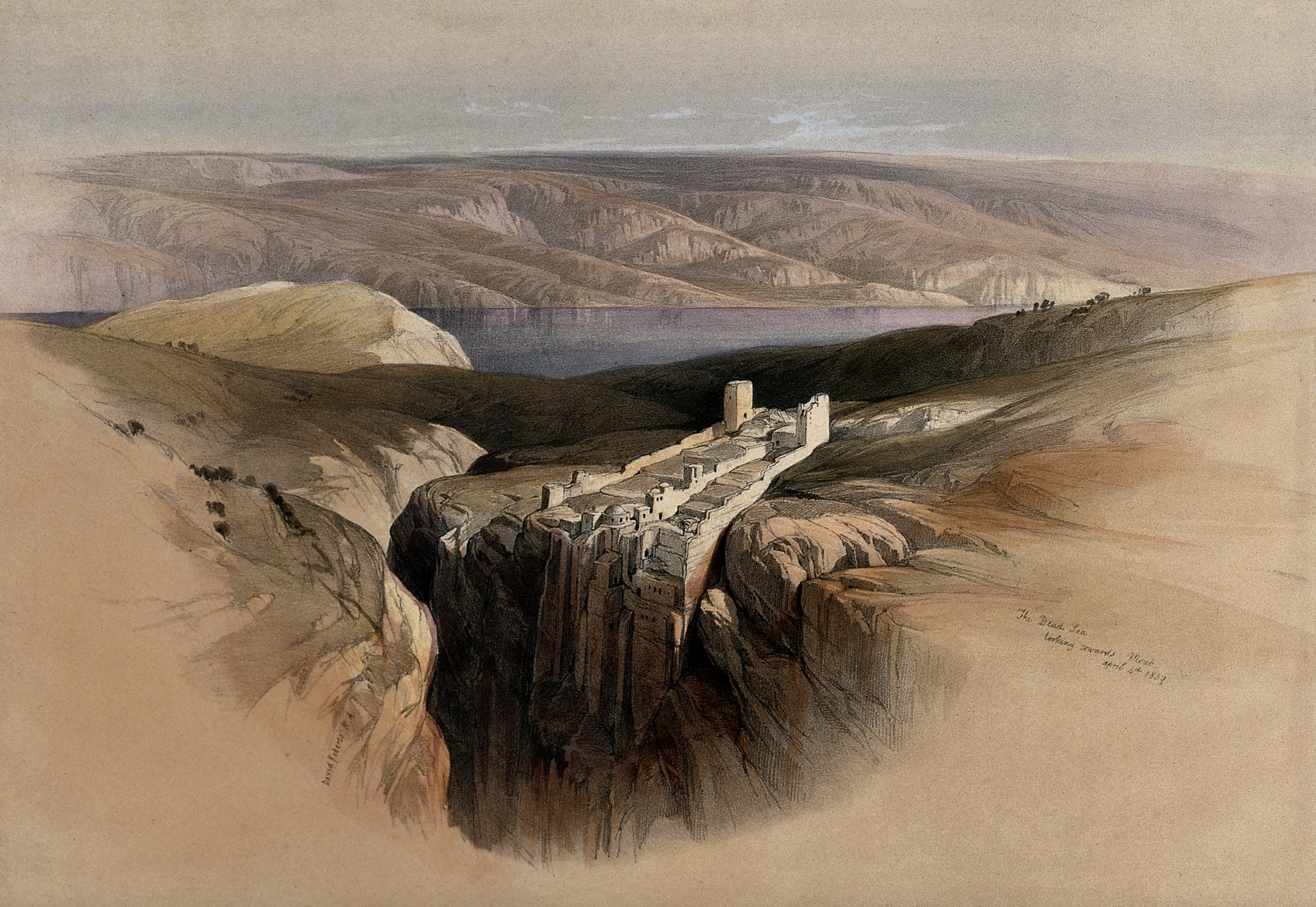
50. The Dead Sea, looking towards Moab.

51. Convent of St. Saba

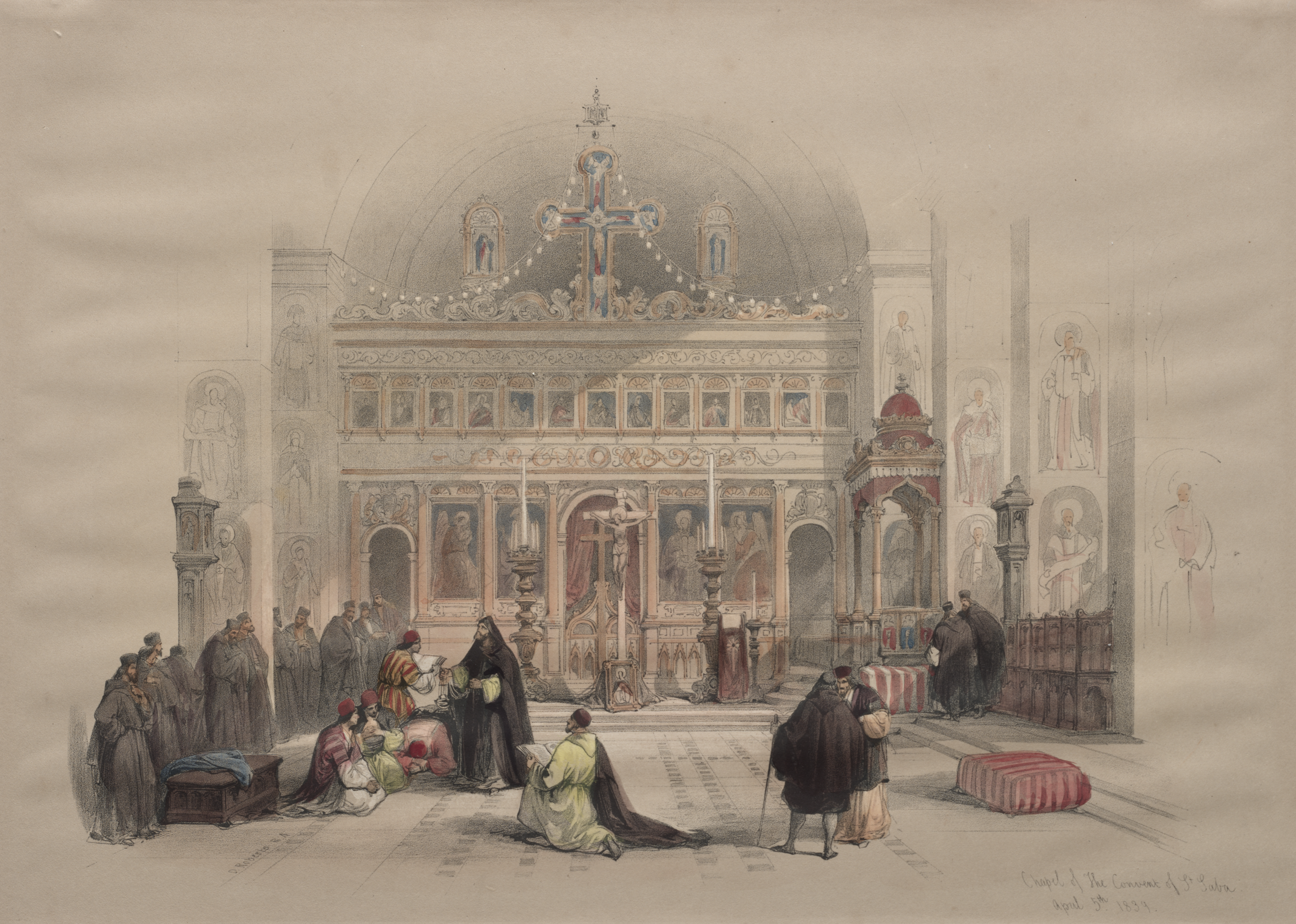
52. The Chapel of St. Saba

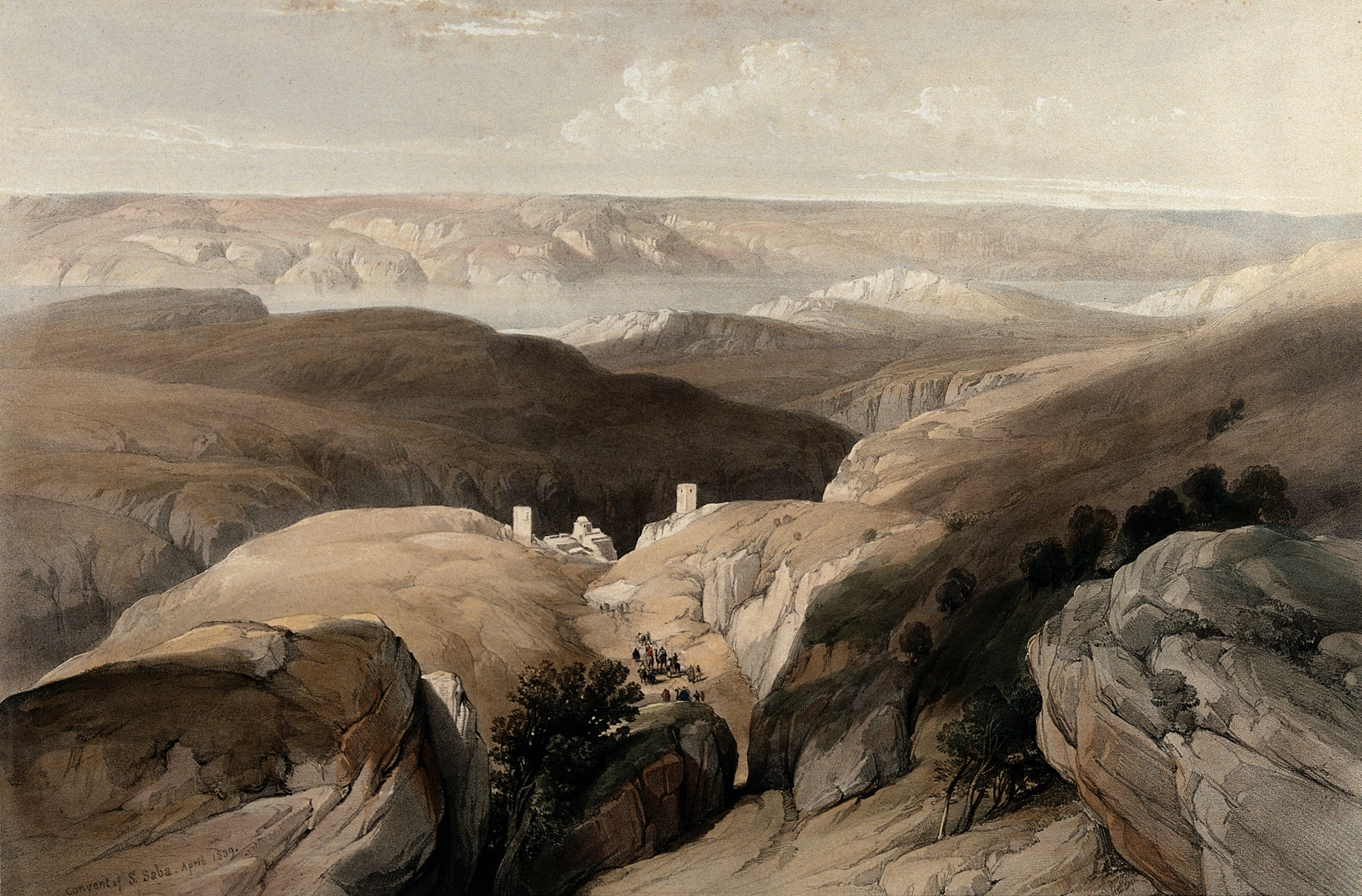
53. Wilderness of Engedi, near the Convent of St. Saba.

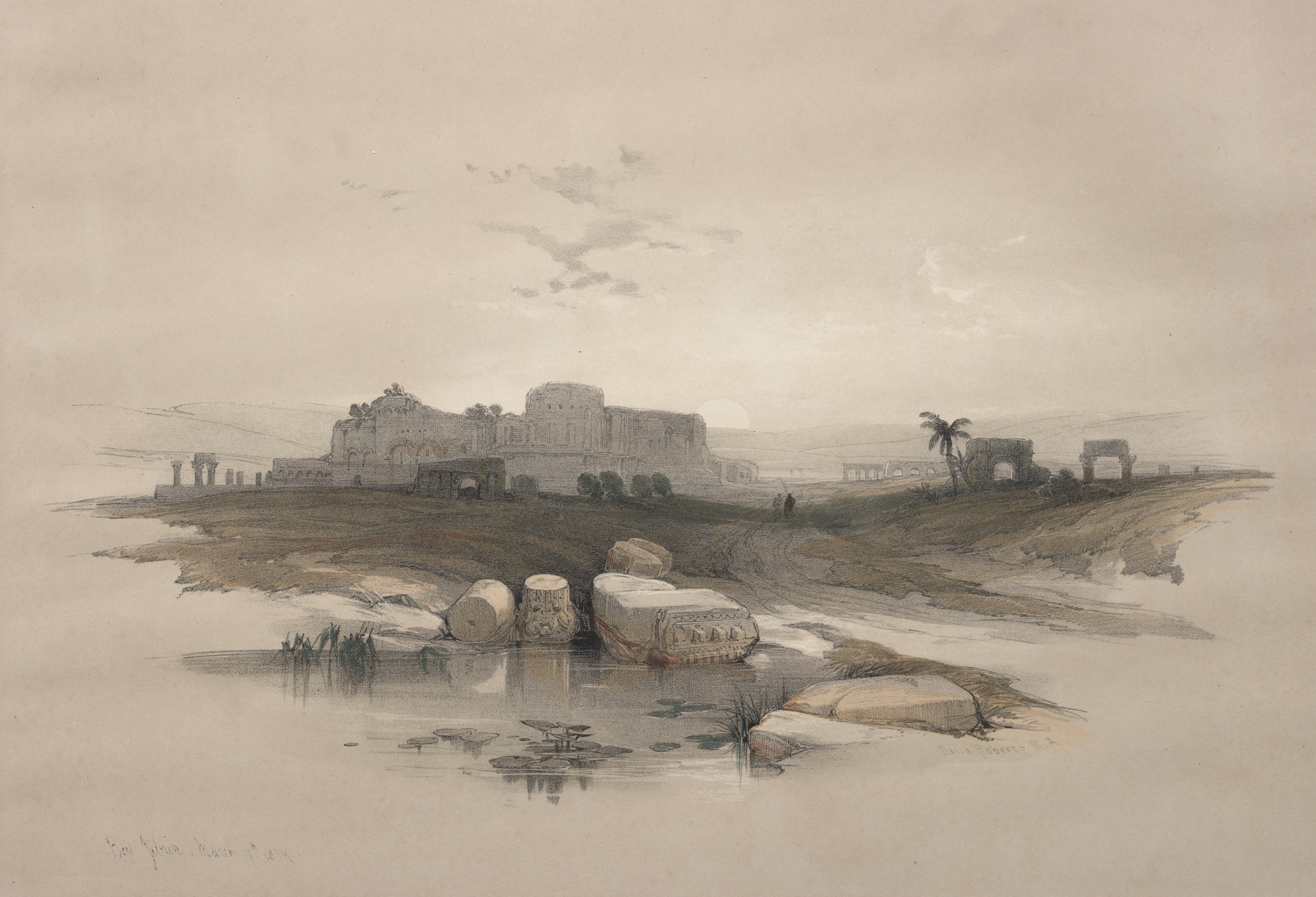
54. Beit Jebrin, or Eleutheropolis.

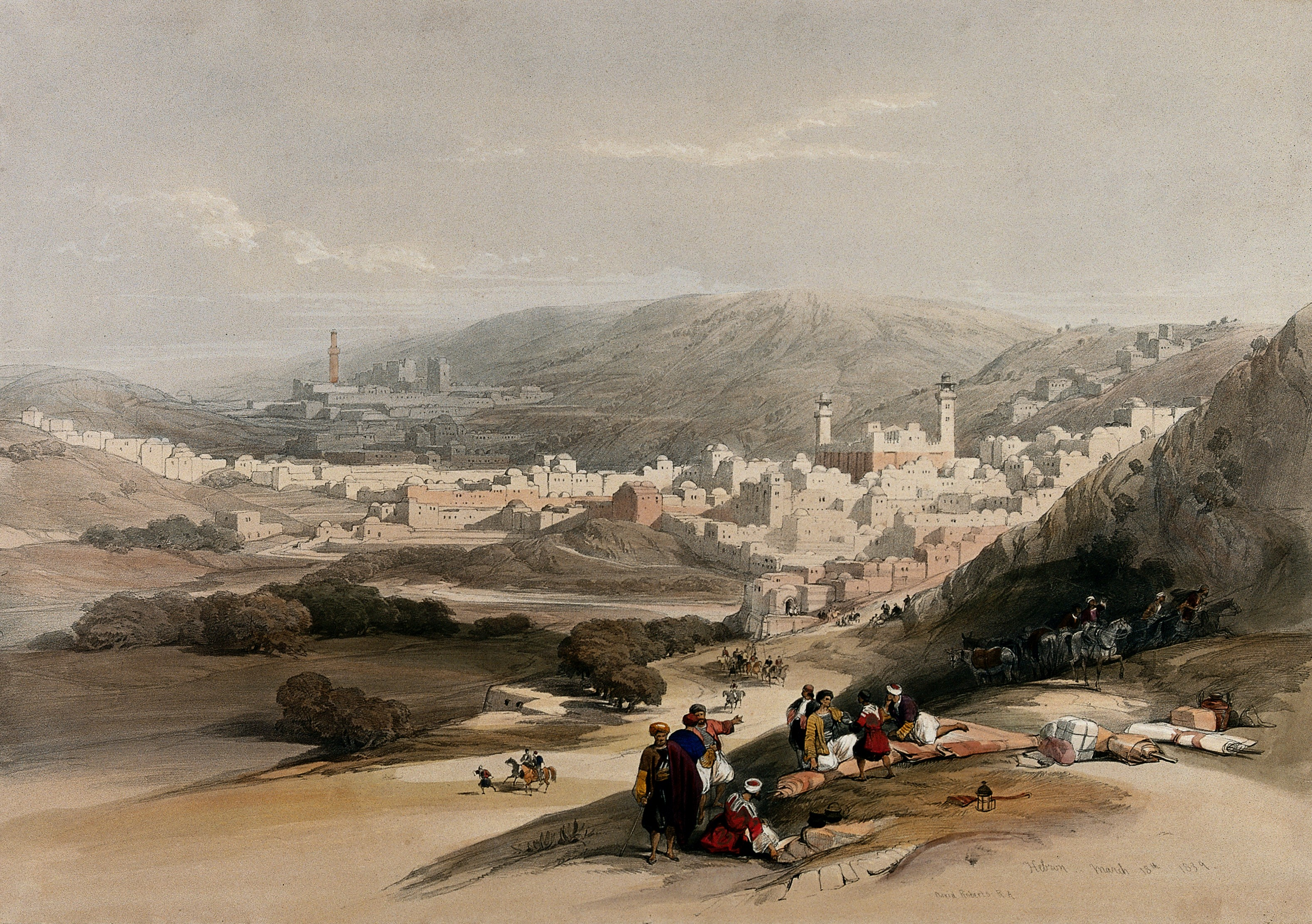
55. Hebron.

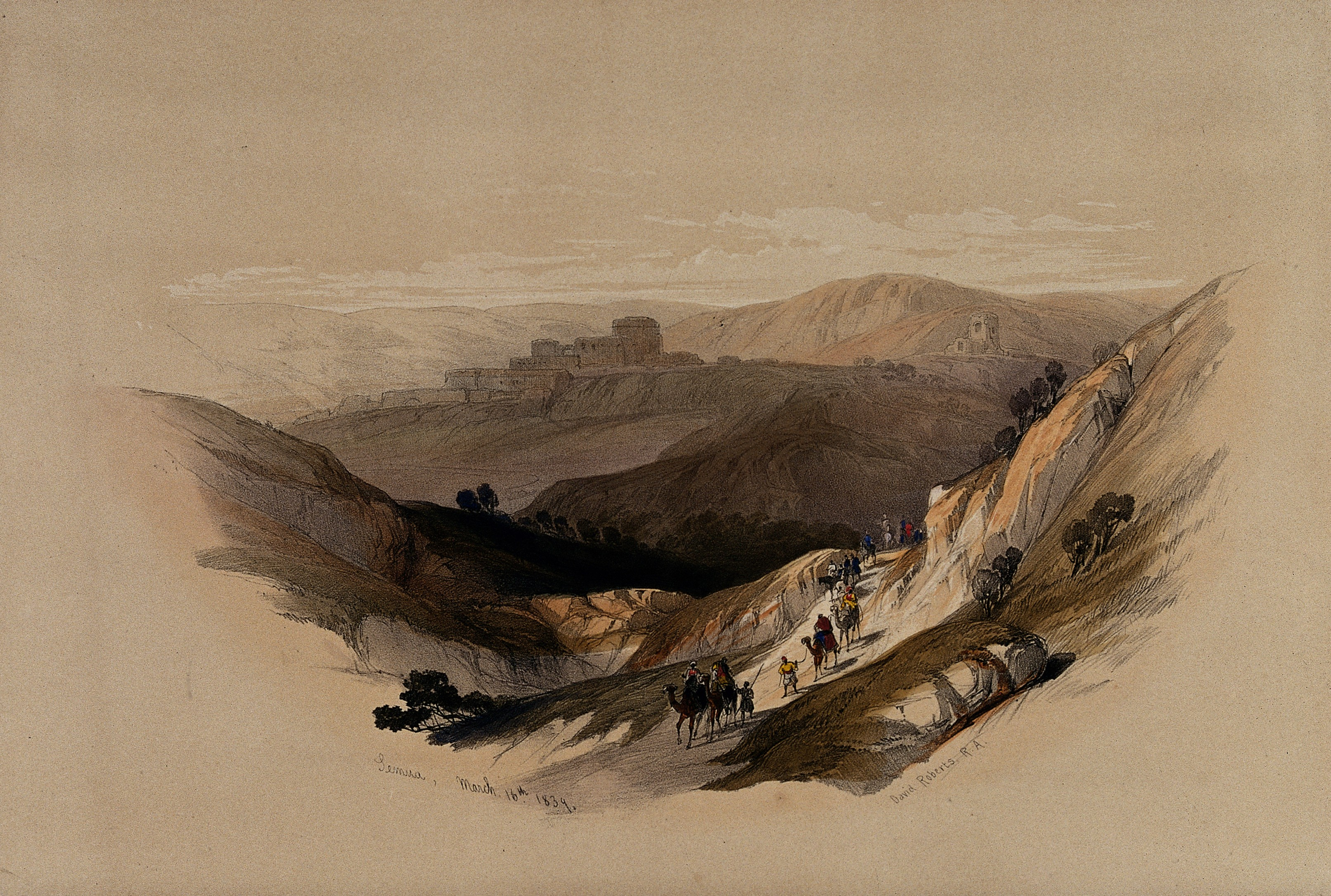
56. Ruins of Semua.

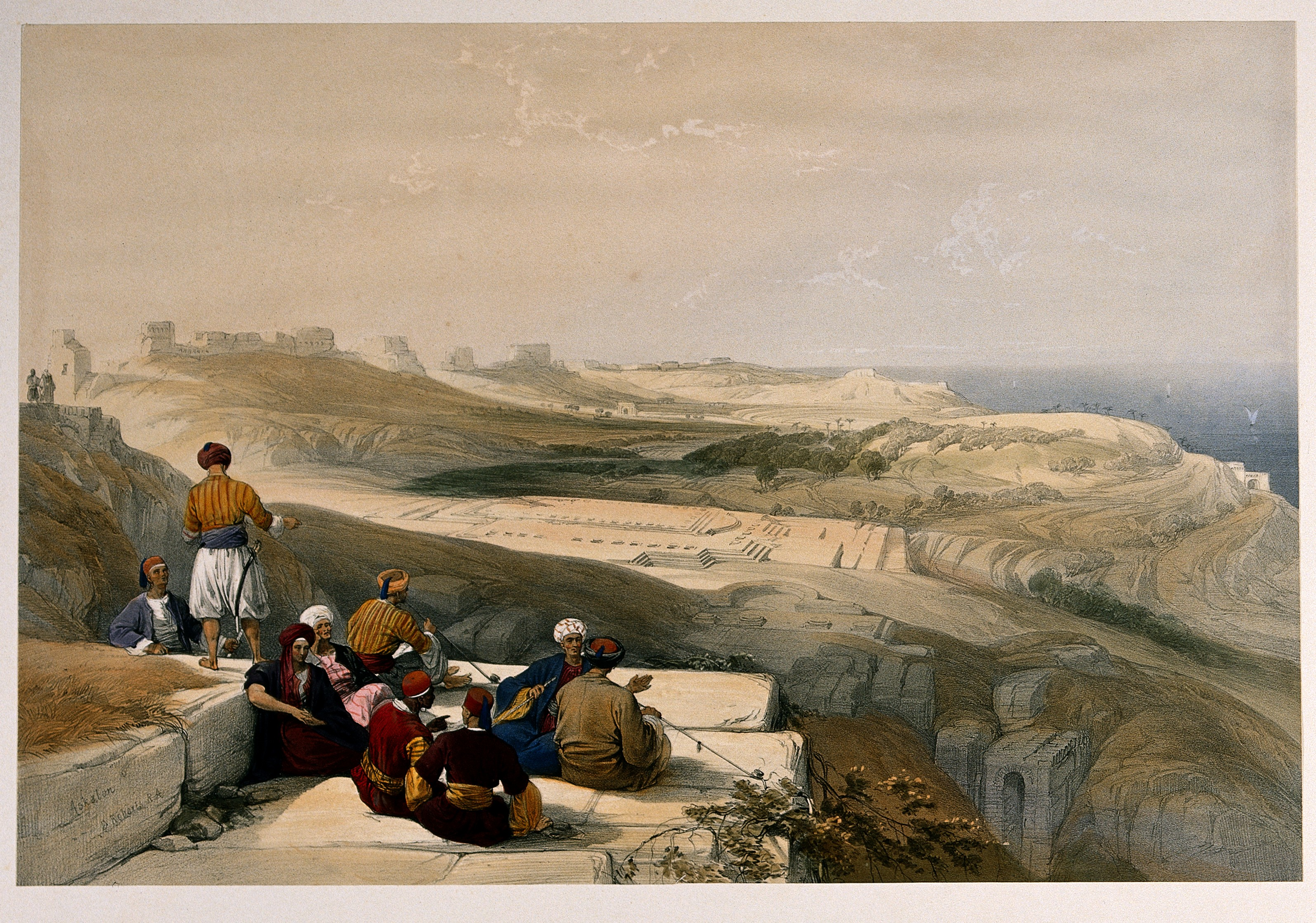
57. Ashkelon.

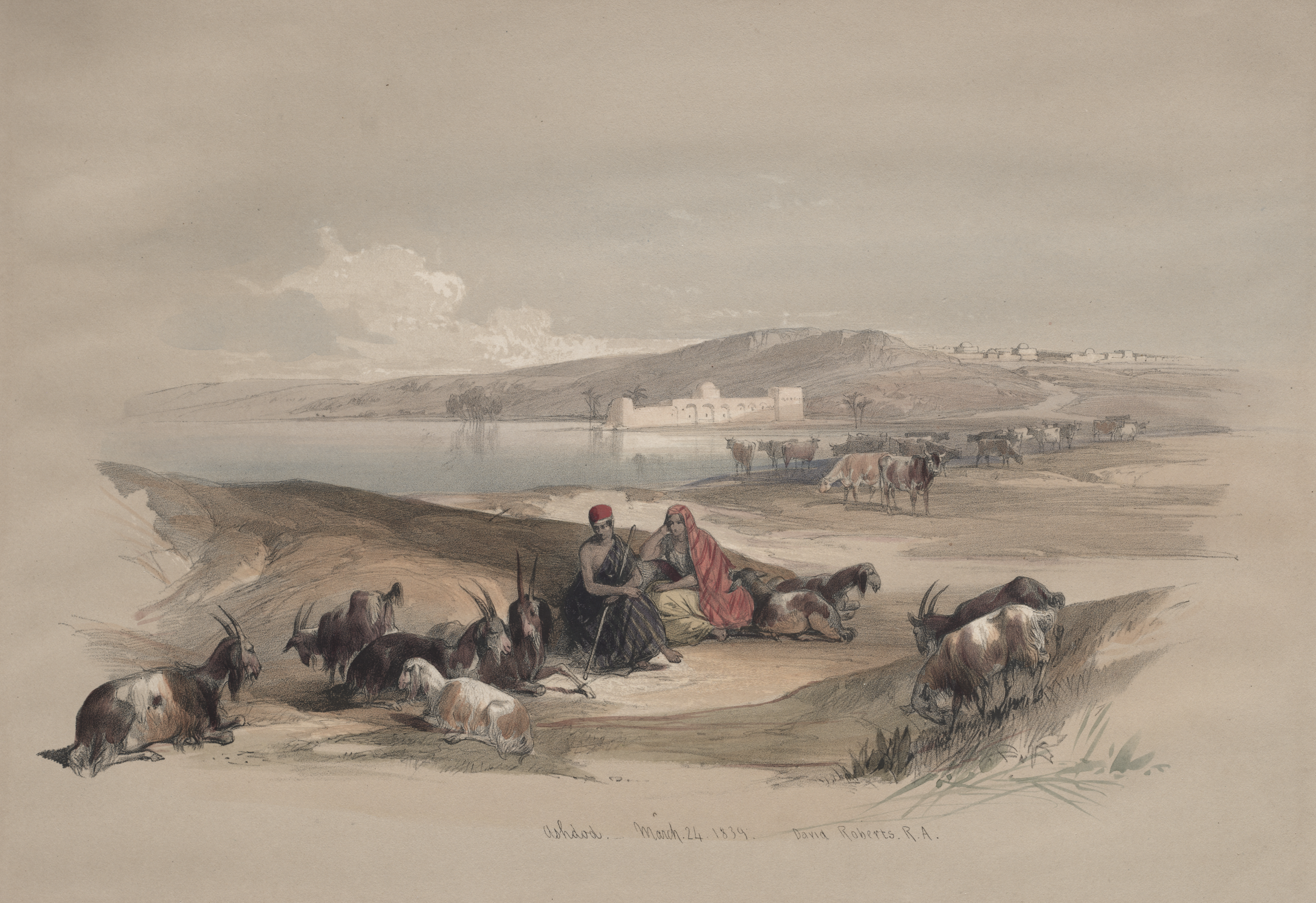
58. Ashdod.

59. Gaza.

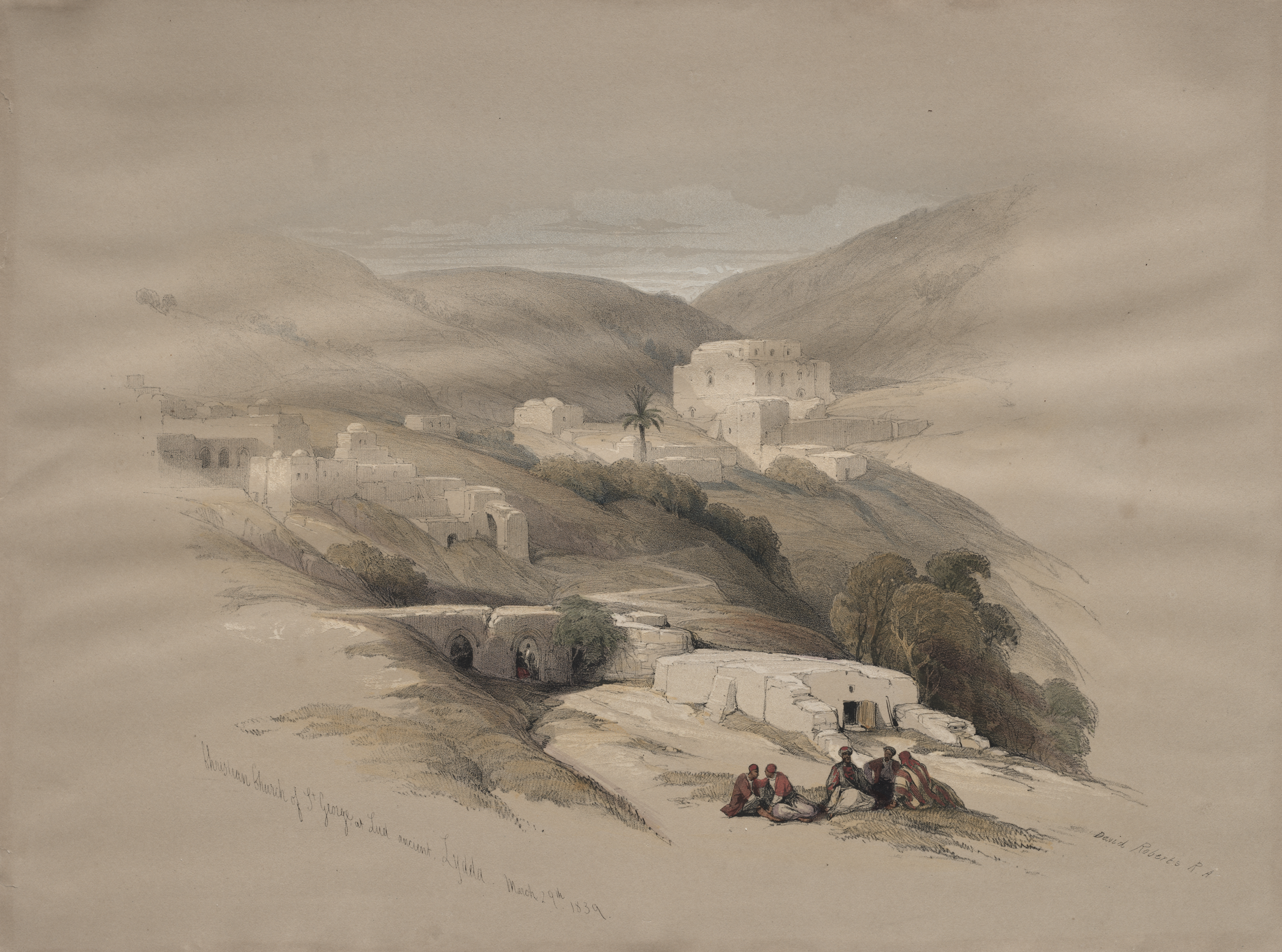
60. Abu Ghosh (mistakenly labelled as Lydda)

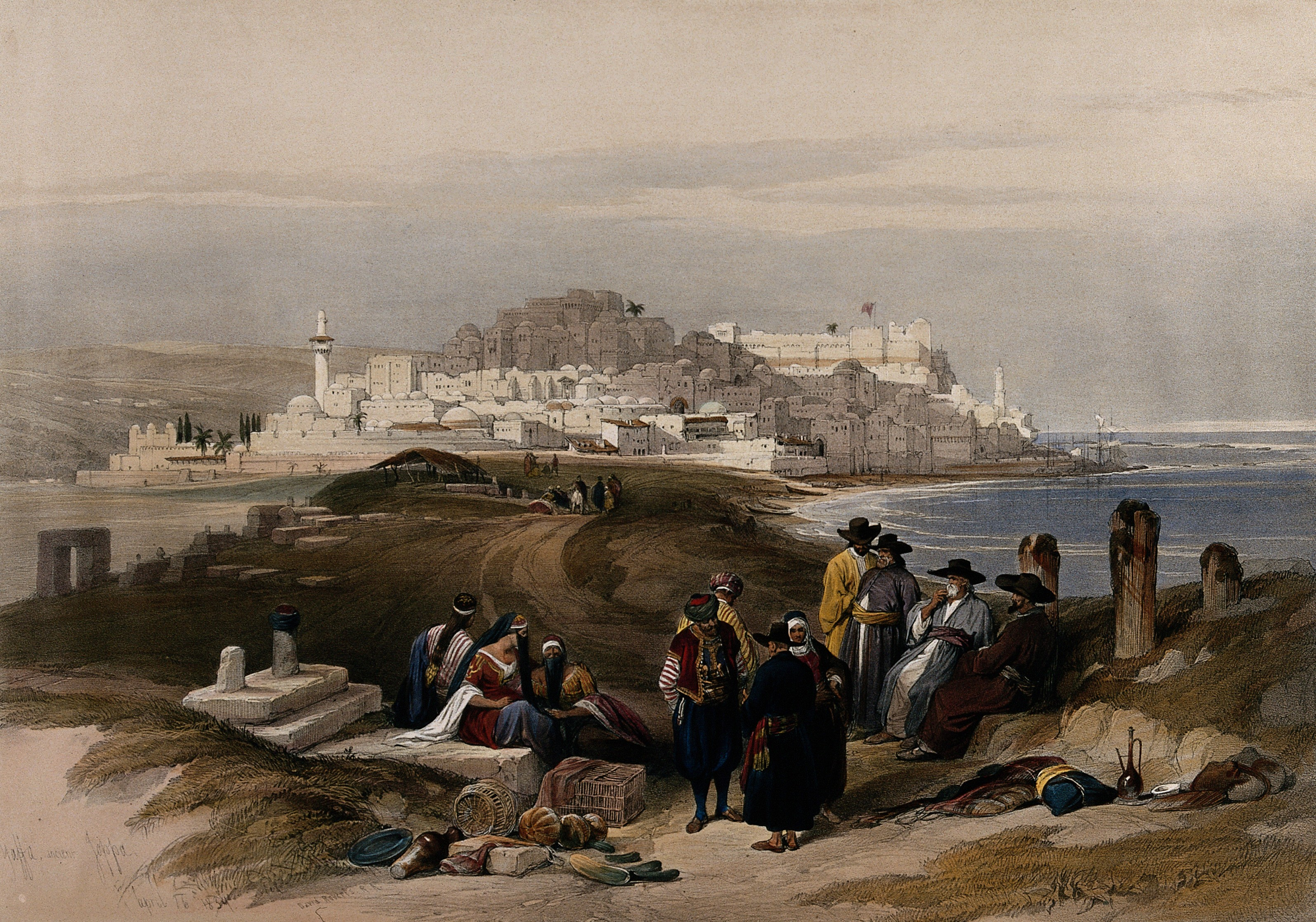
61. Jaffa, looking South.

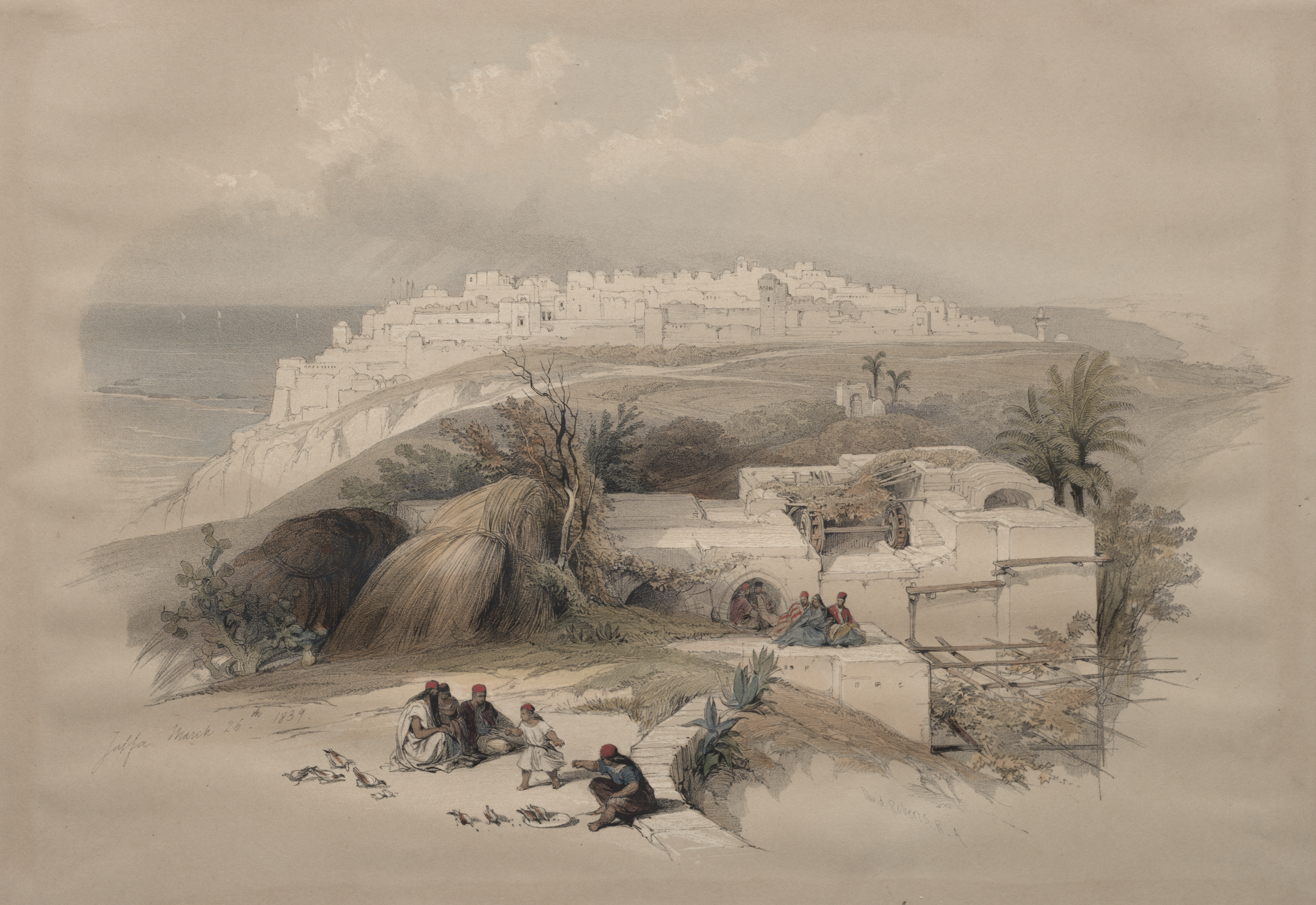
62. Jaffa, looking North.

63. Caipha, looking towards Mount Carmel.

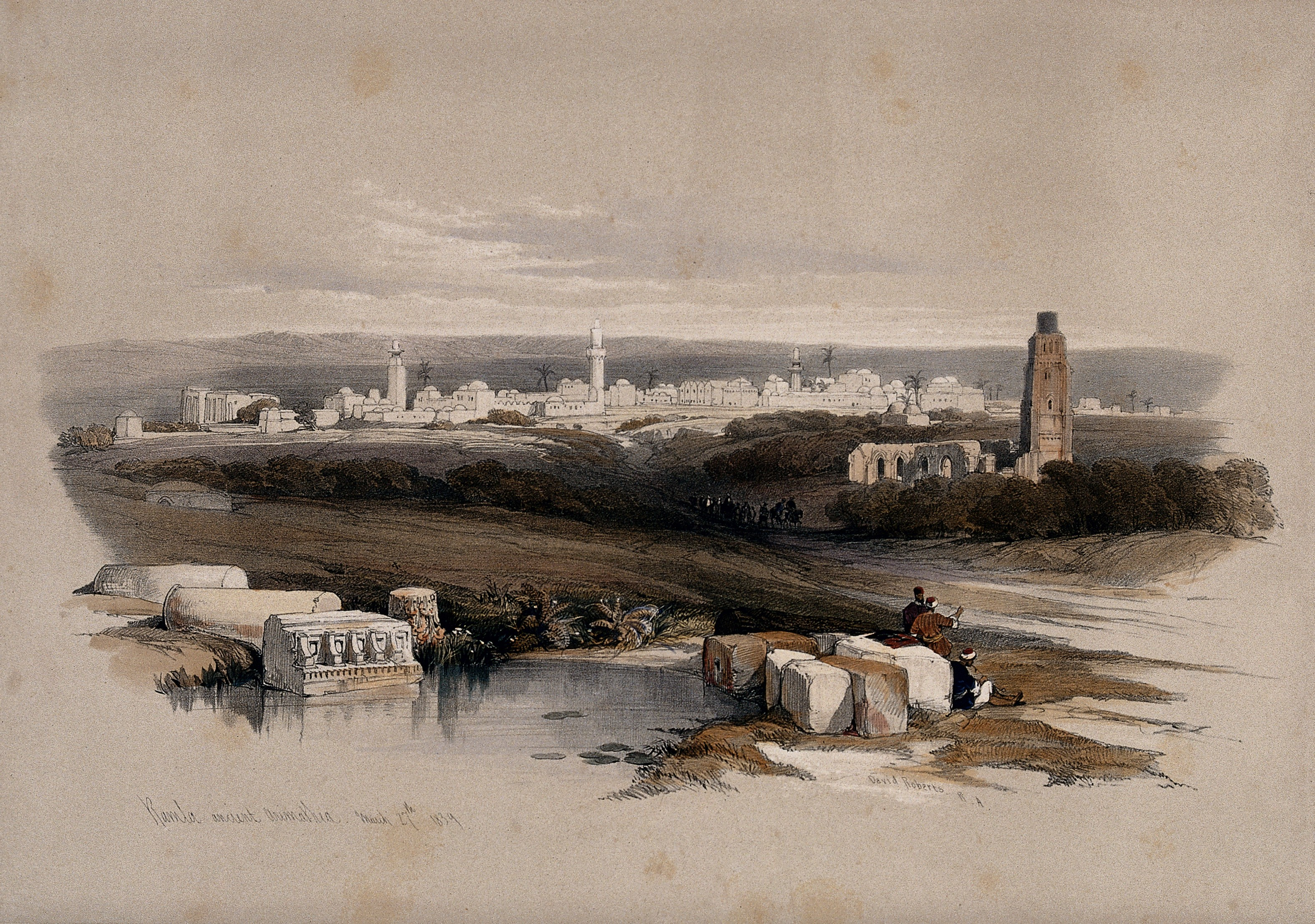
64. Ramla.

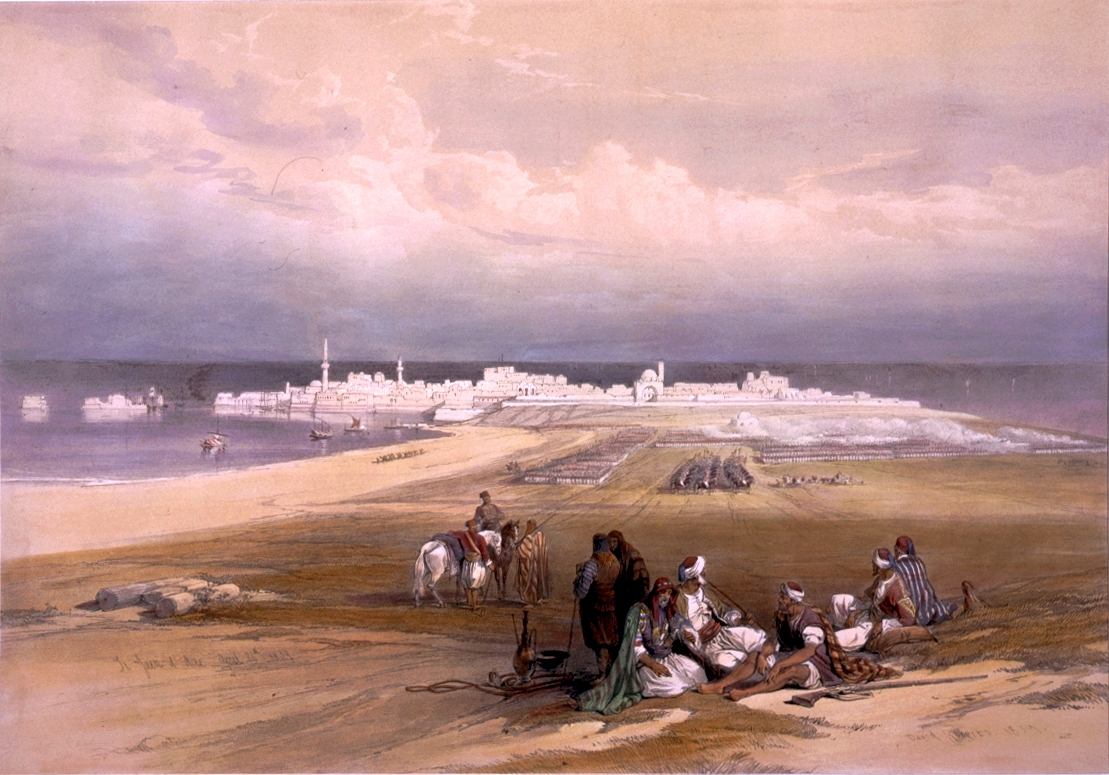
65. St. Jean D'Acre, from the land.

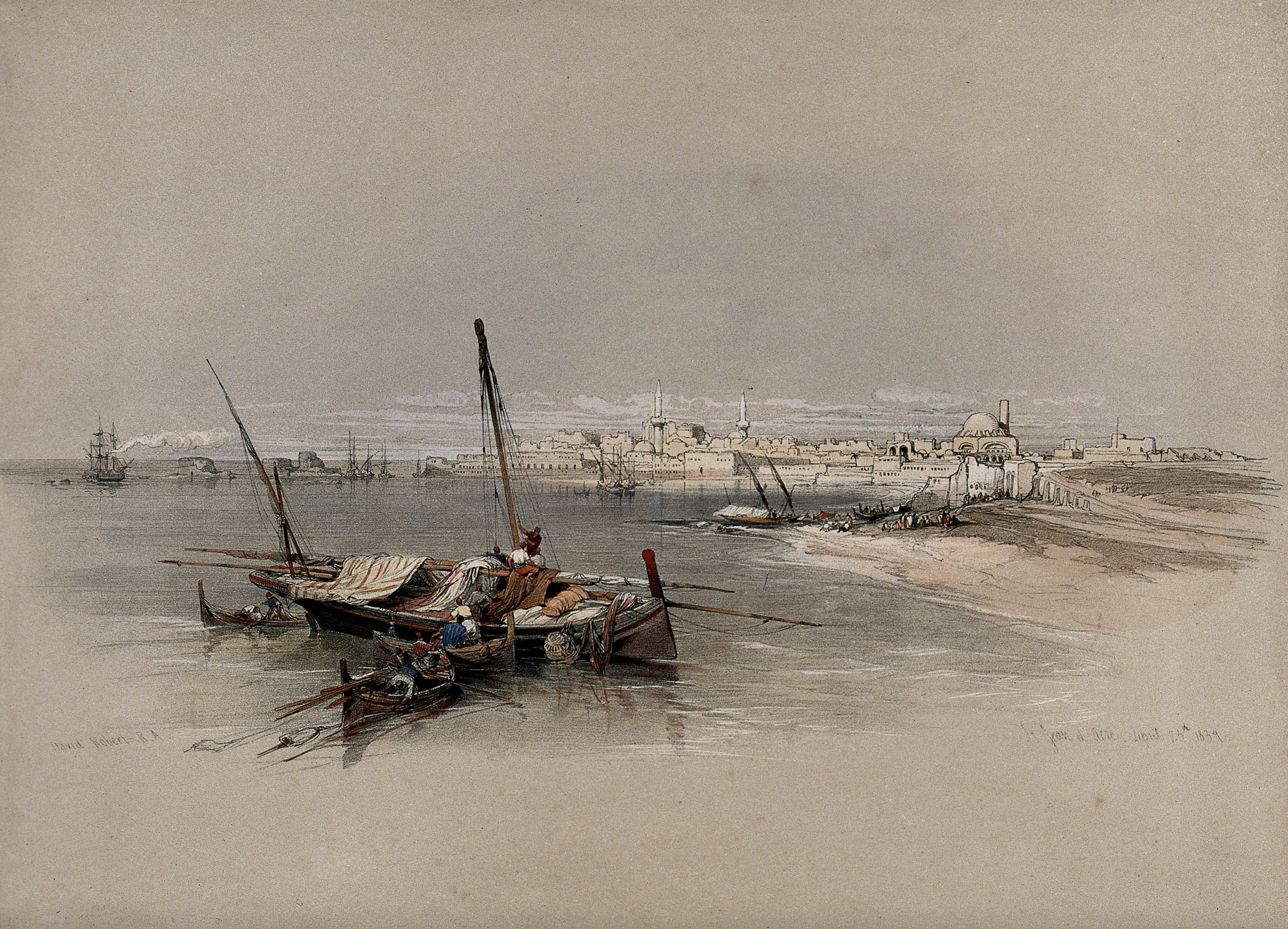
66. St. Jean D'Acre from the sea.

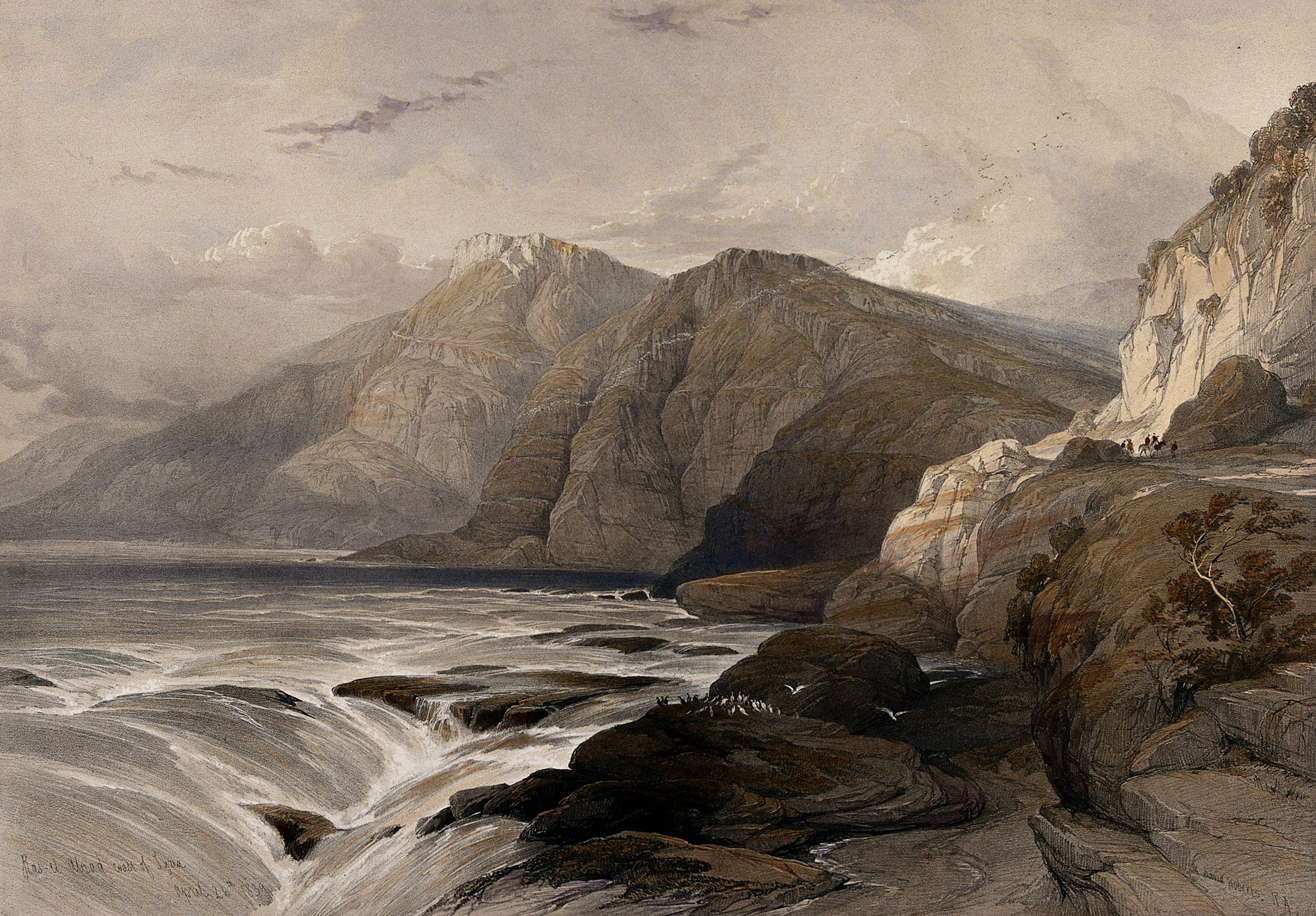
67. Cape Blanco.

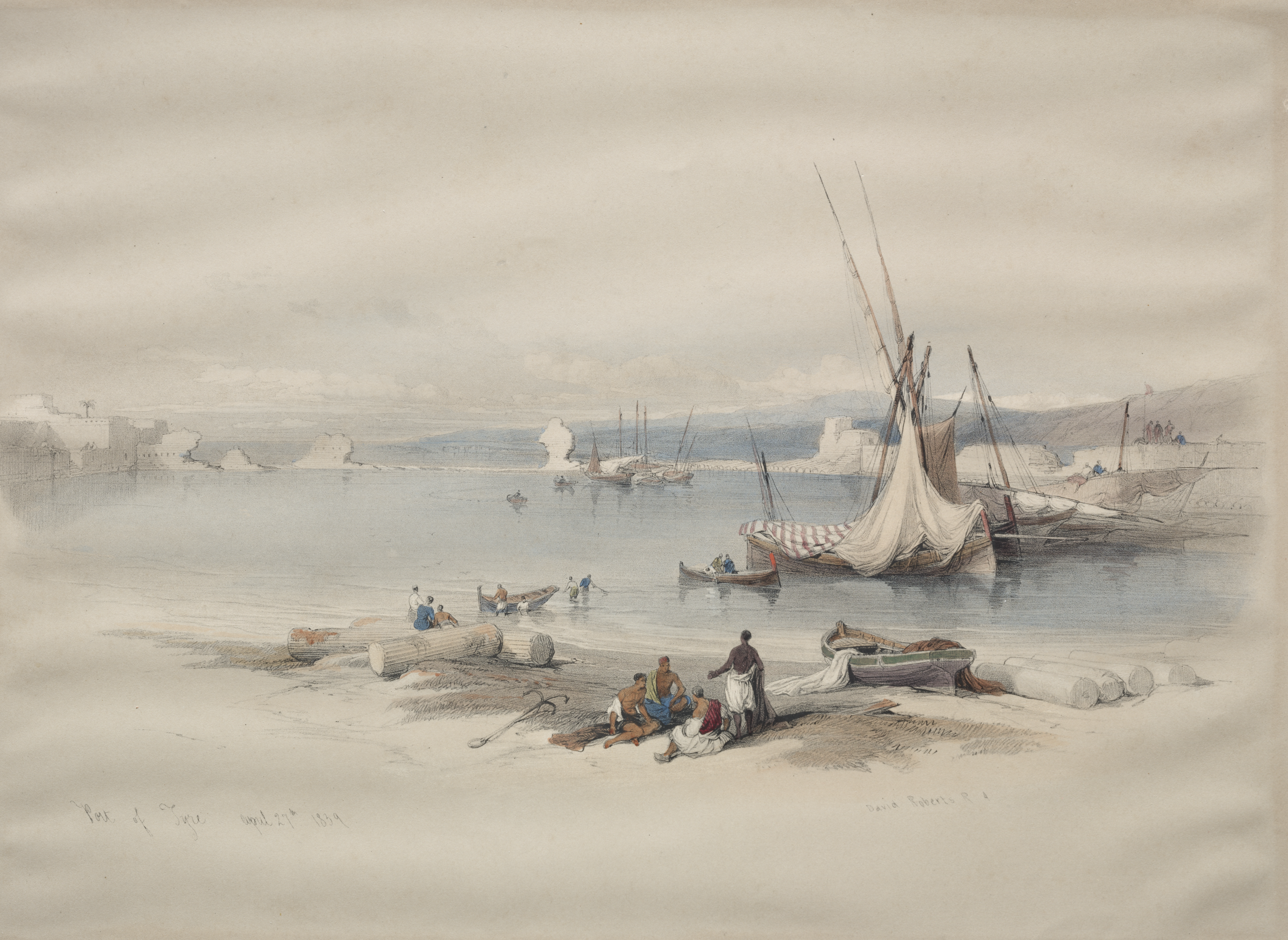
68. Port of Tyre.

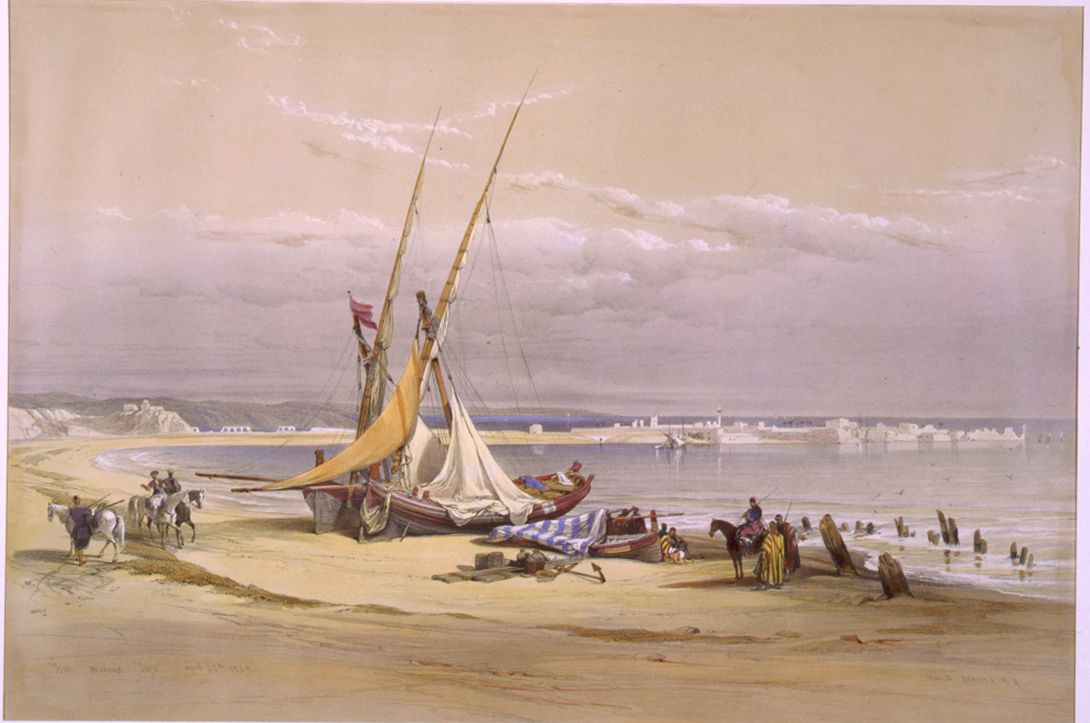
69. General view of Tyre.

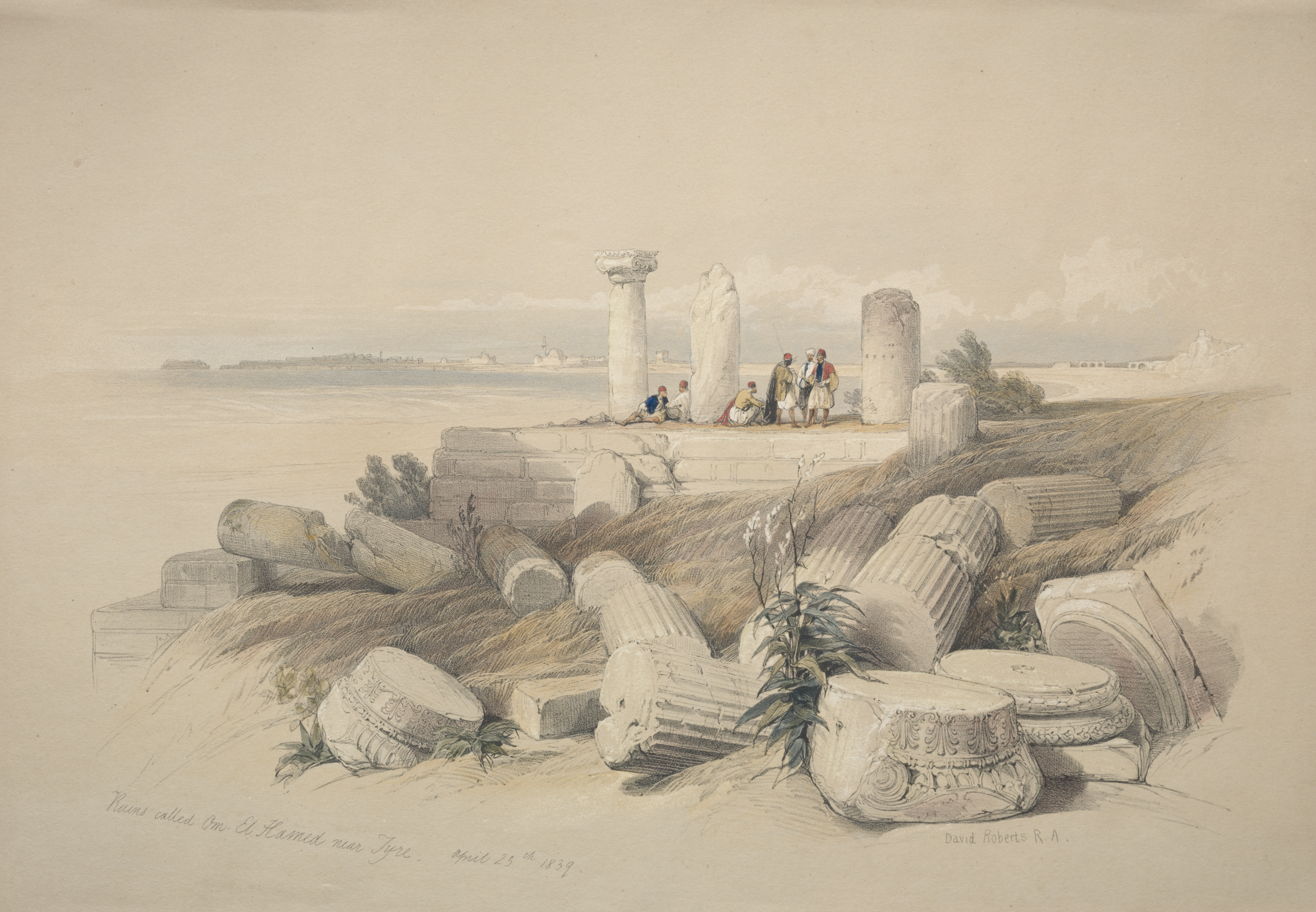
70. Ruins of the Ionic Temple of Om-el-Hamed, near Tyre

71. Tyre from the Isthmus.

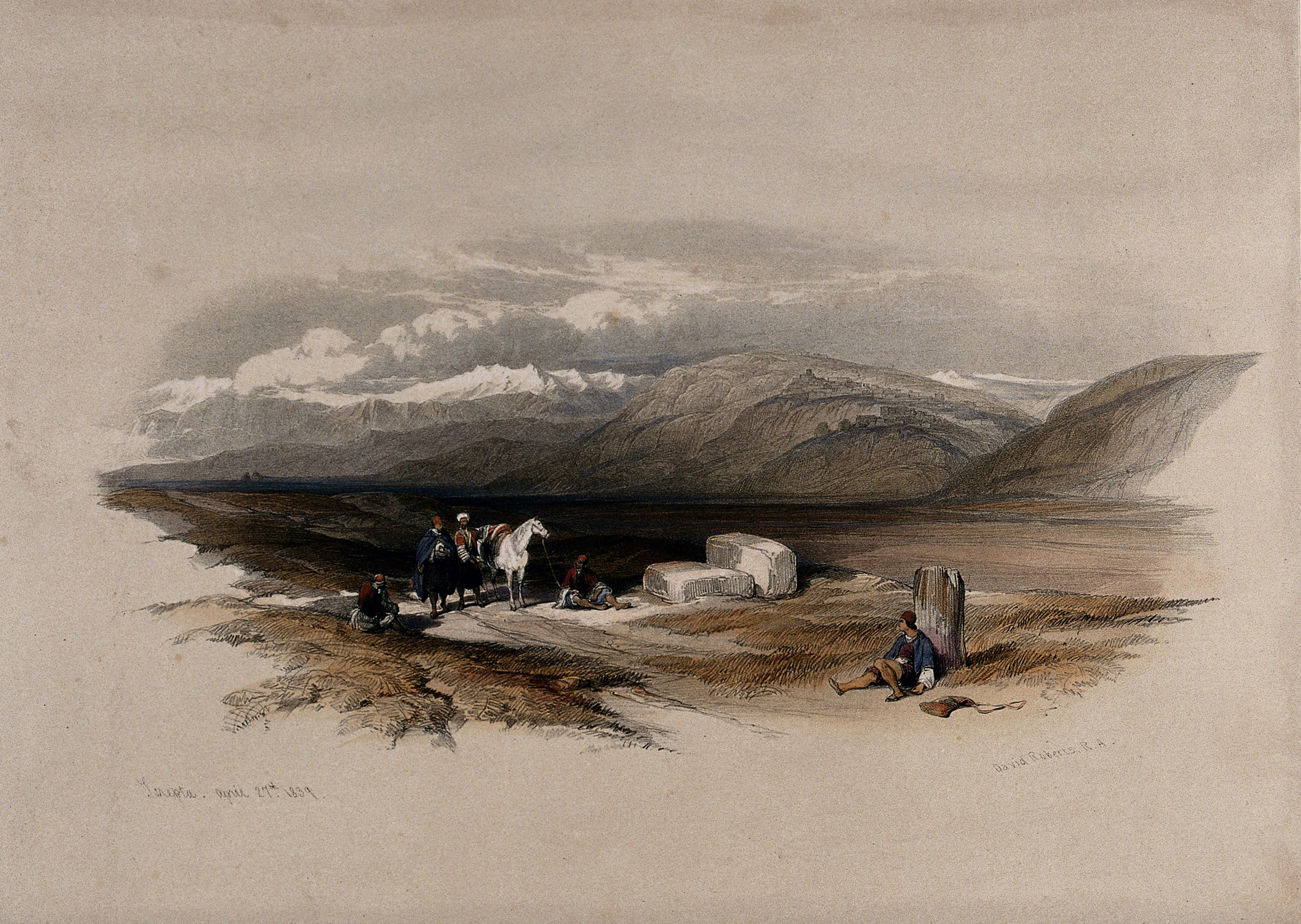
72. Sarepta

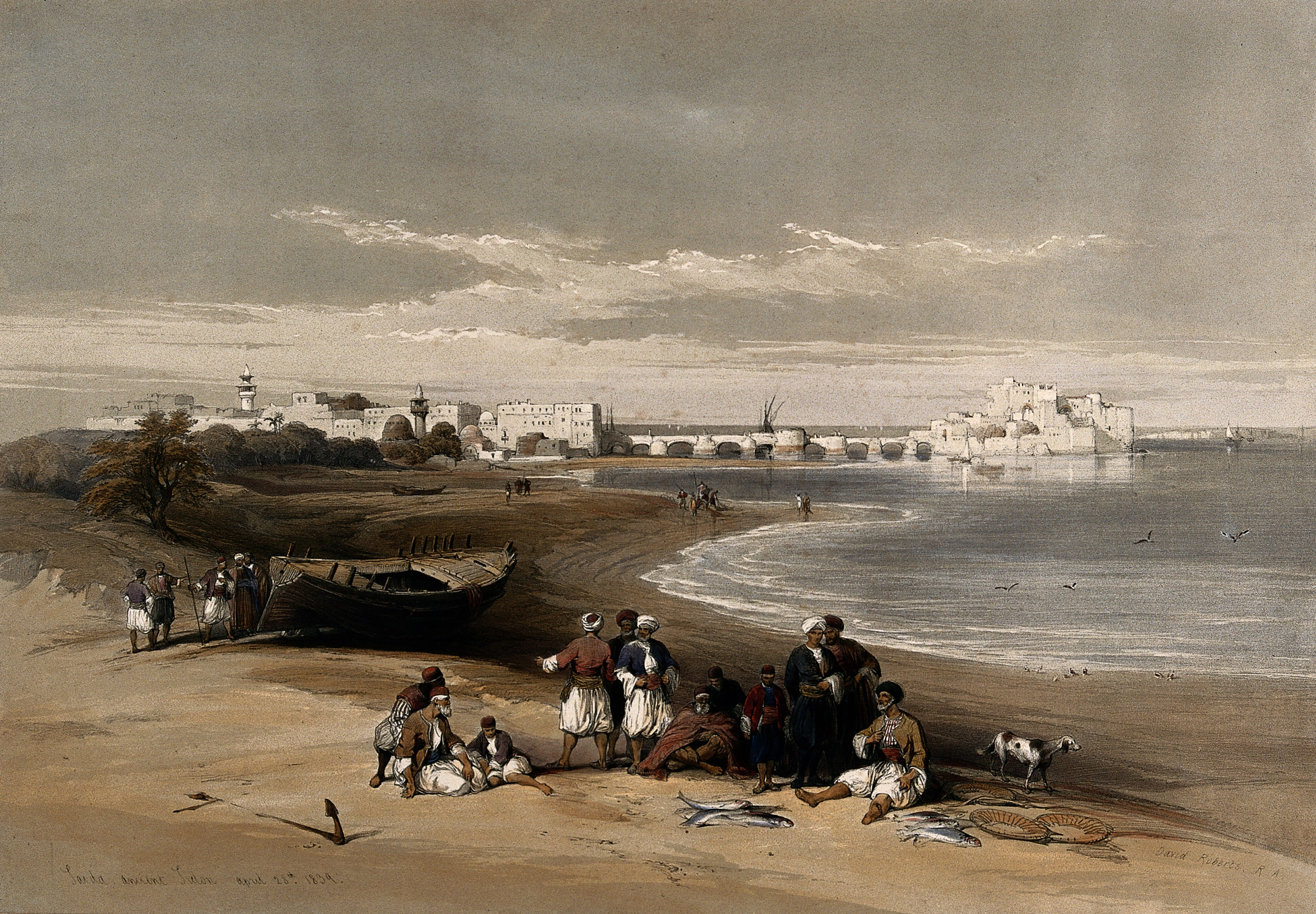
73. Sidon.

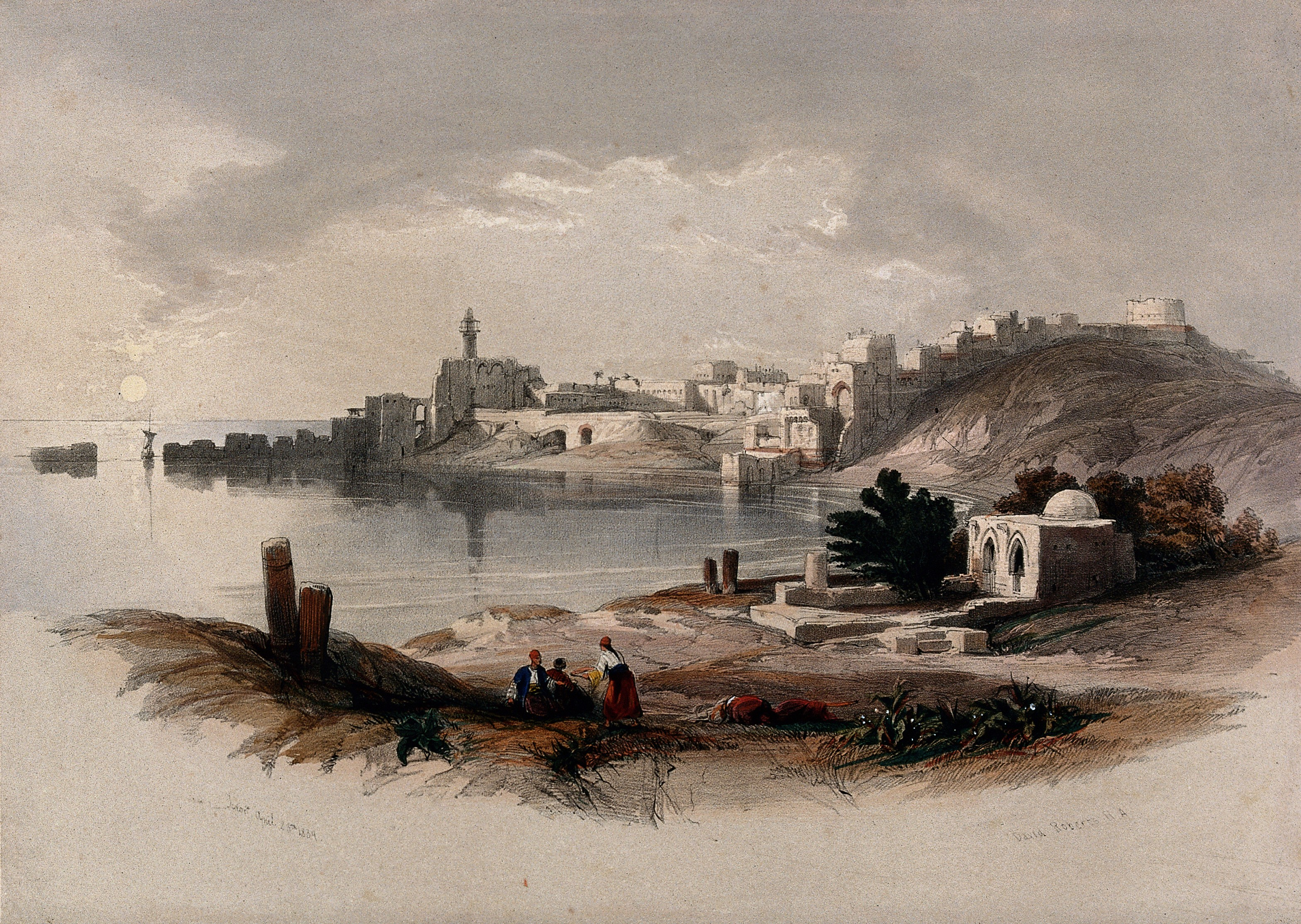
74. Sidon, from the North.

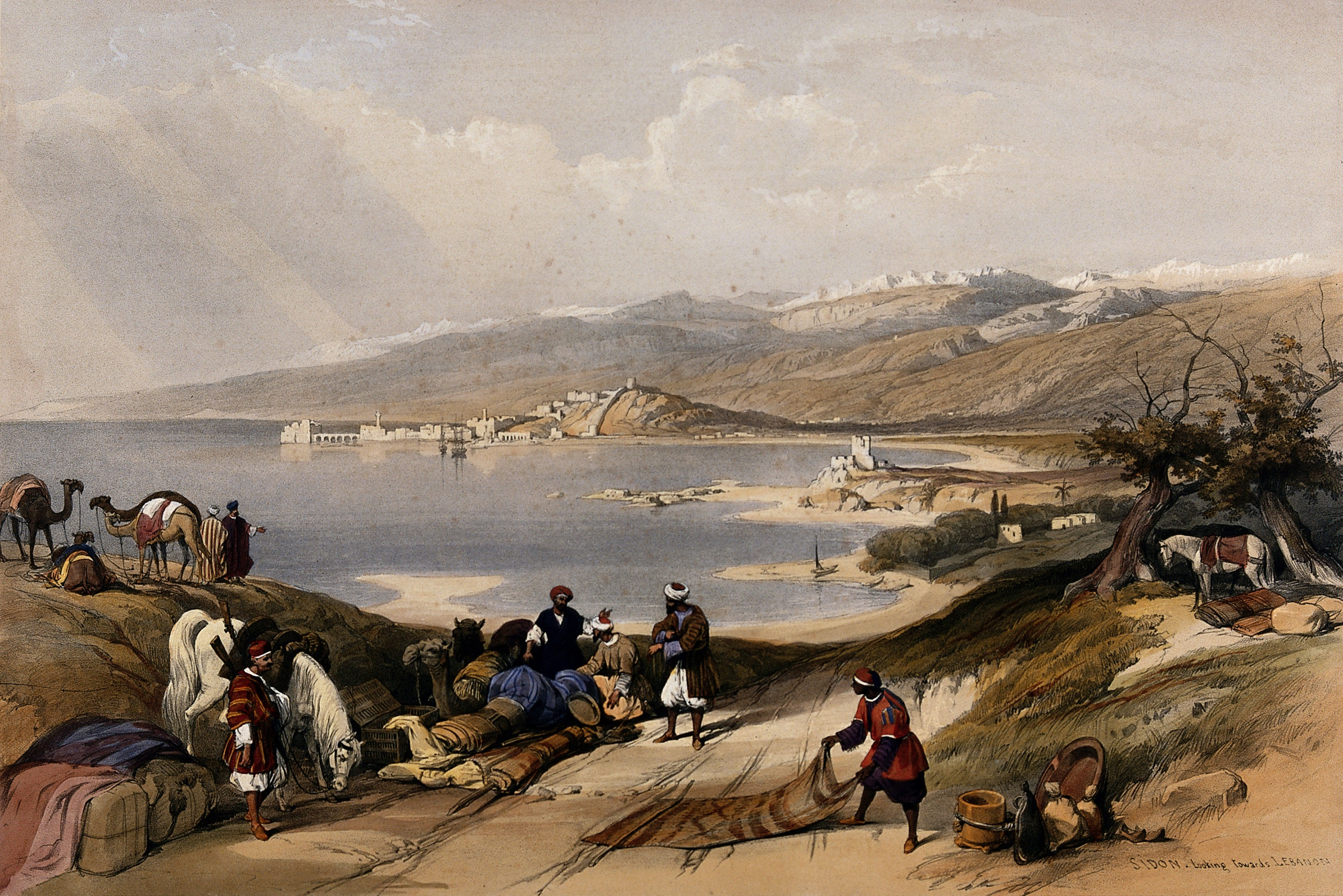
75. Sidon, looking towards Lebanon.

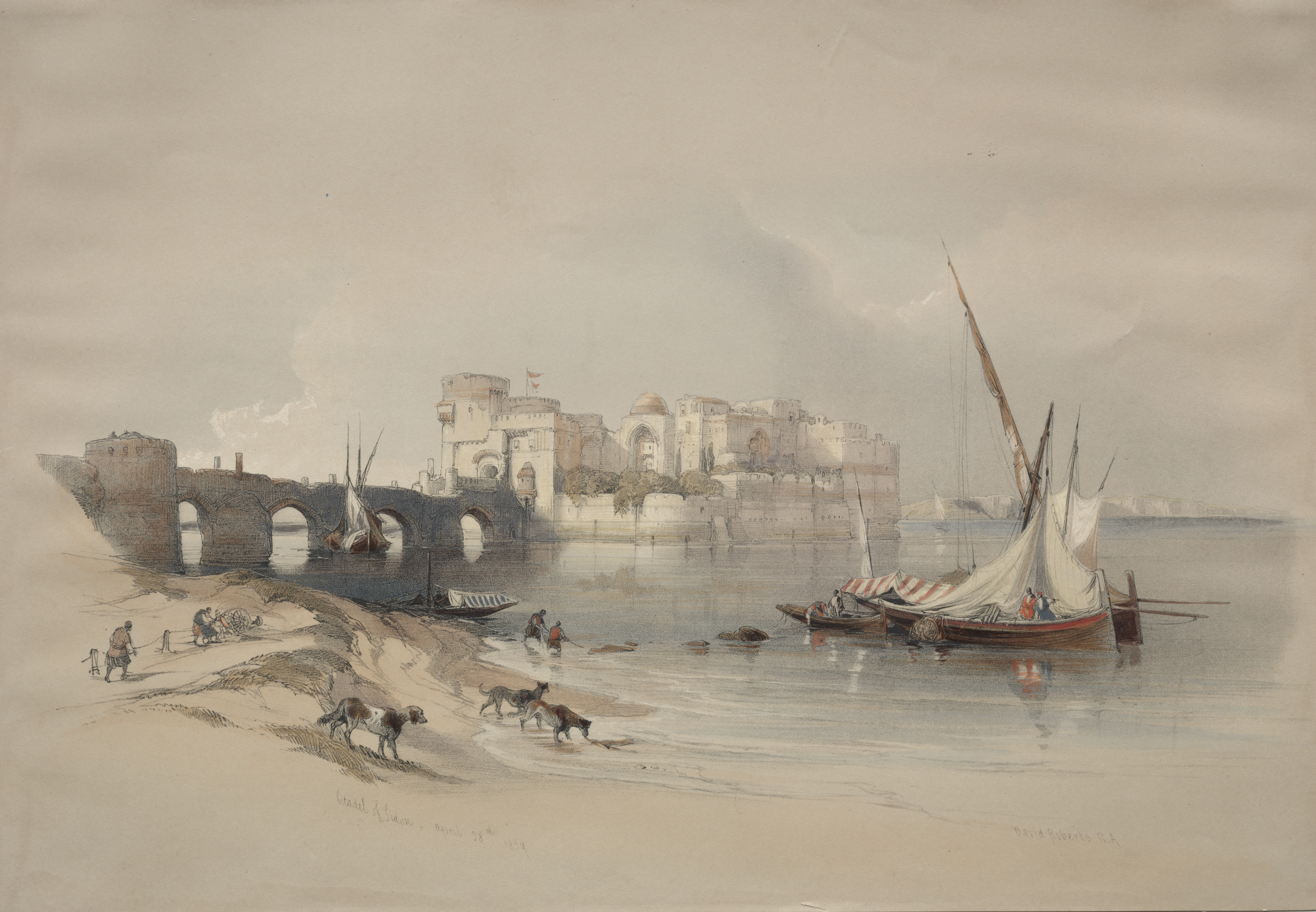
76. The Citadel of Sidon.

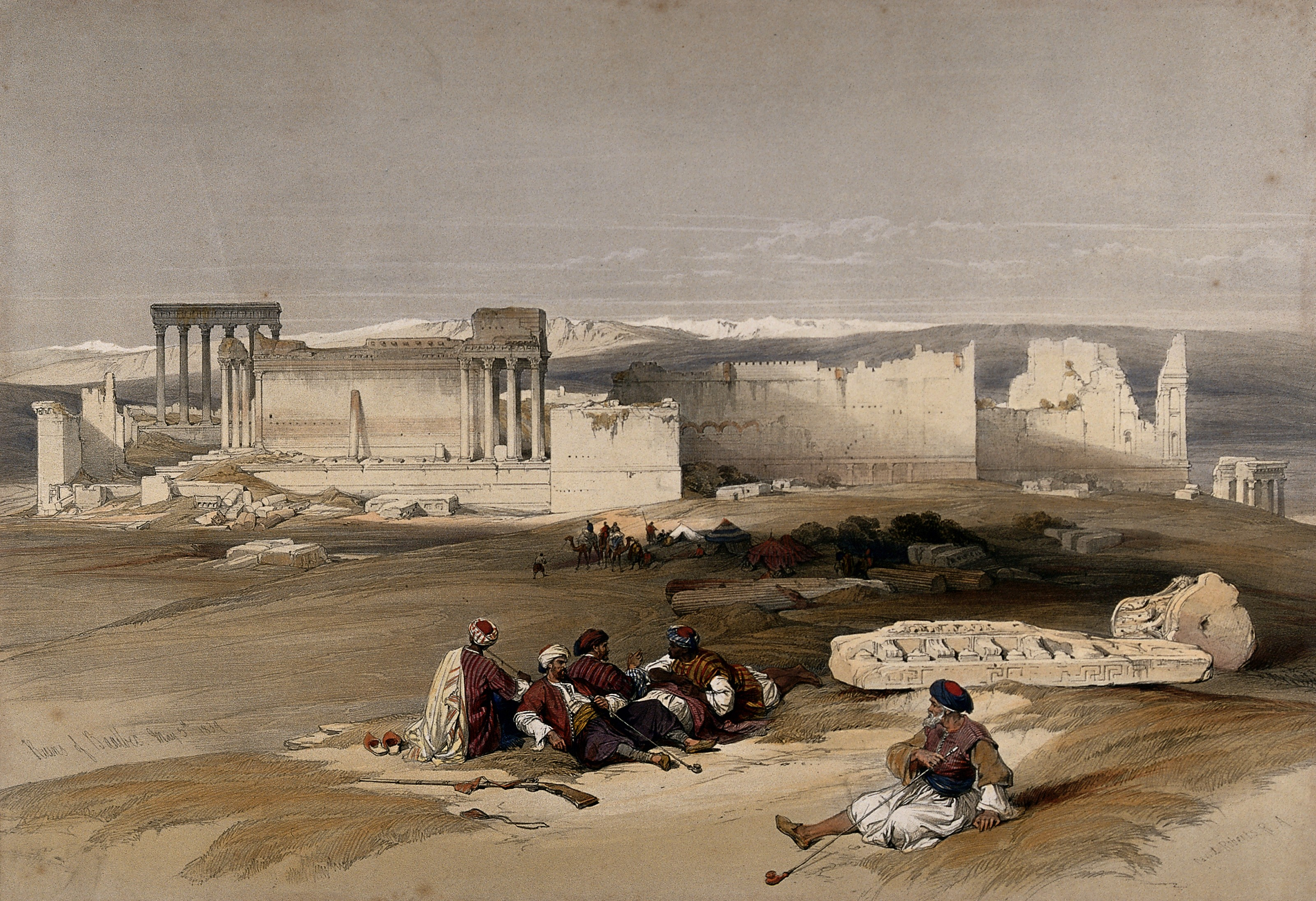
77. Baalbec, general view.

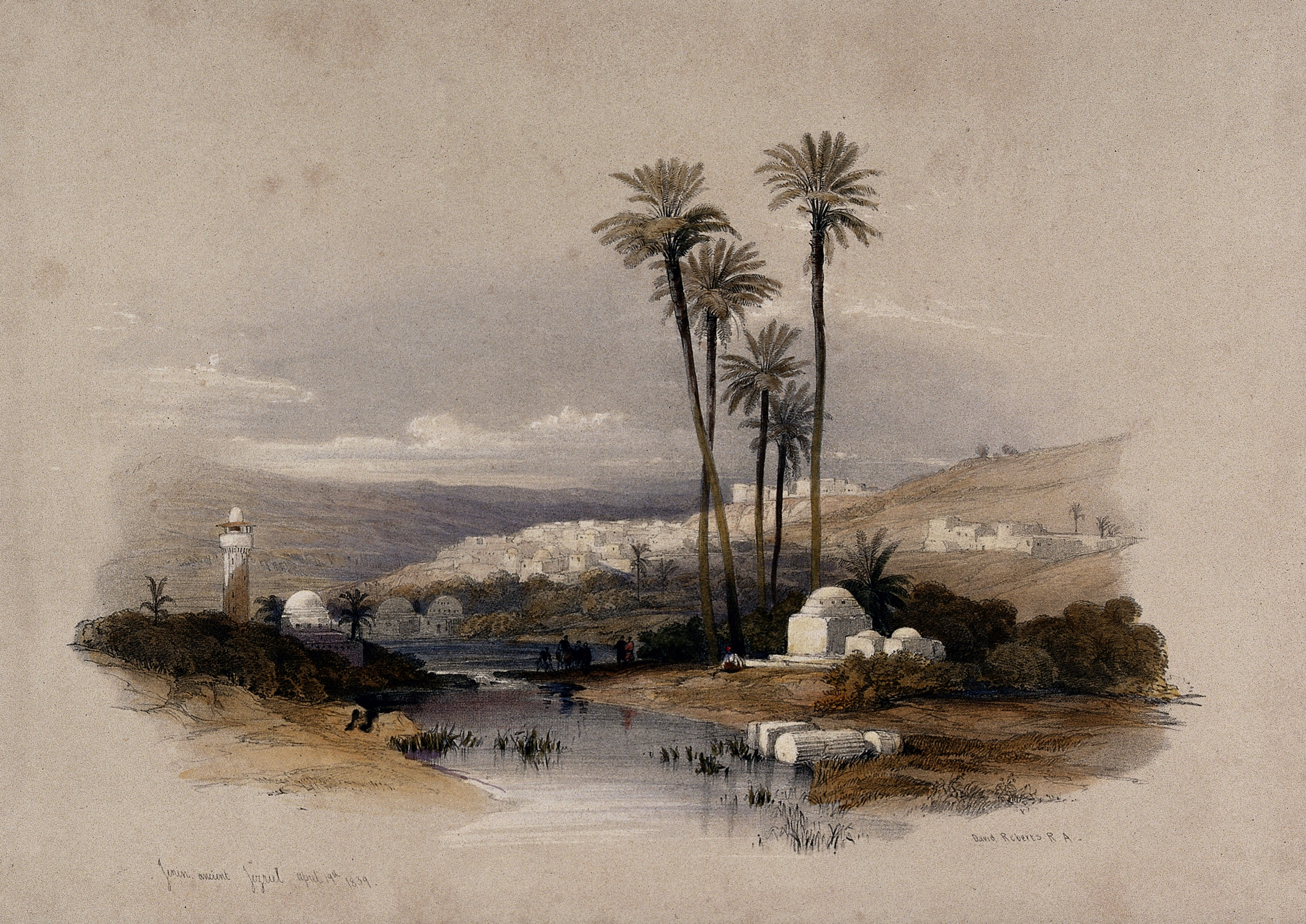
78. Jenin, ancient Jezreel.

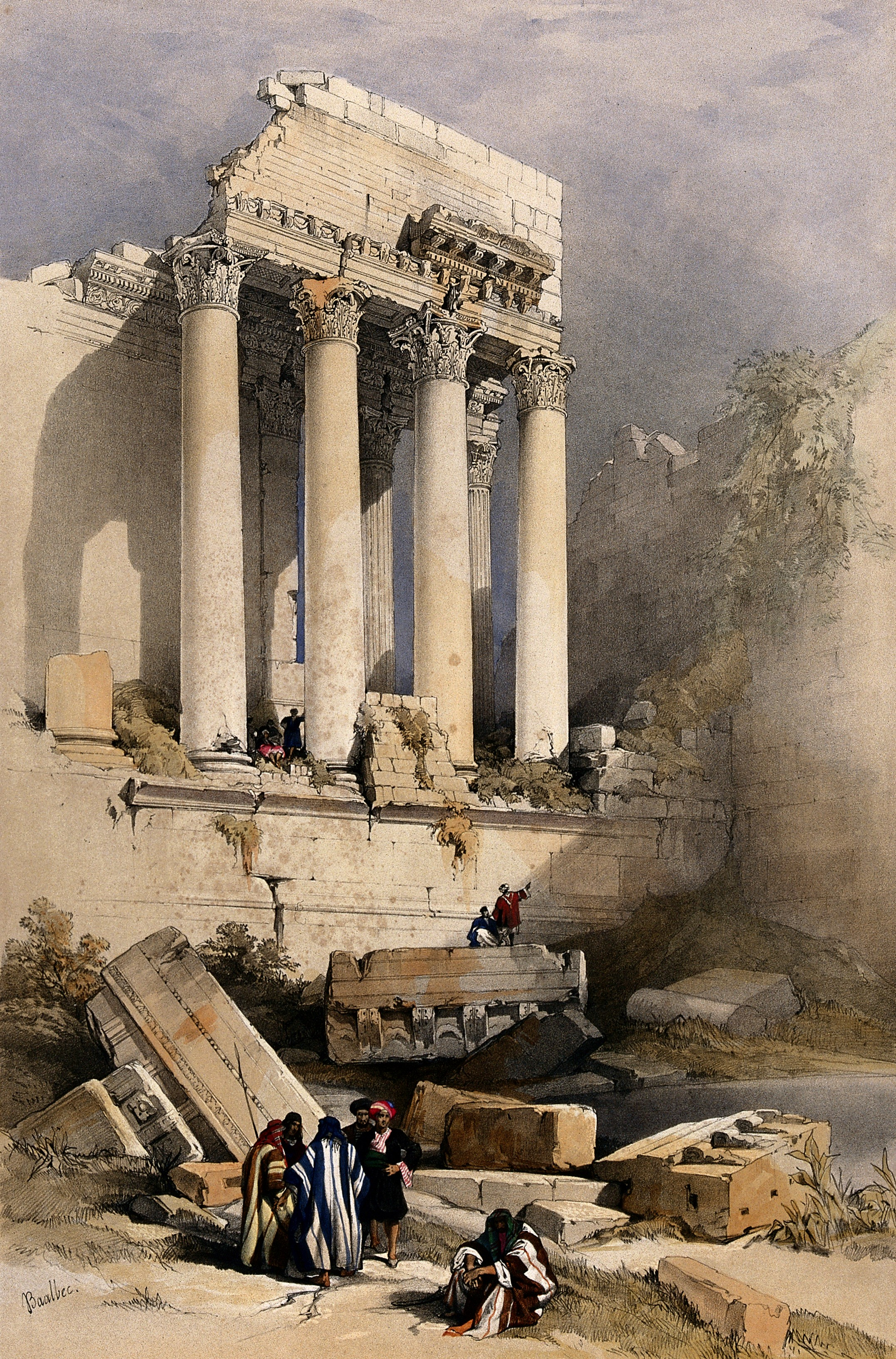
79. Baalbec, Western Portico.

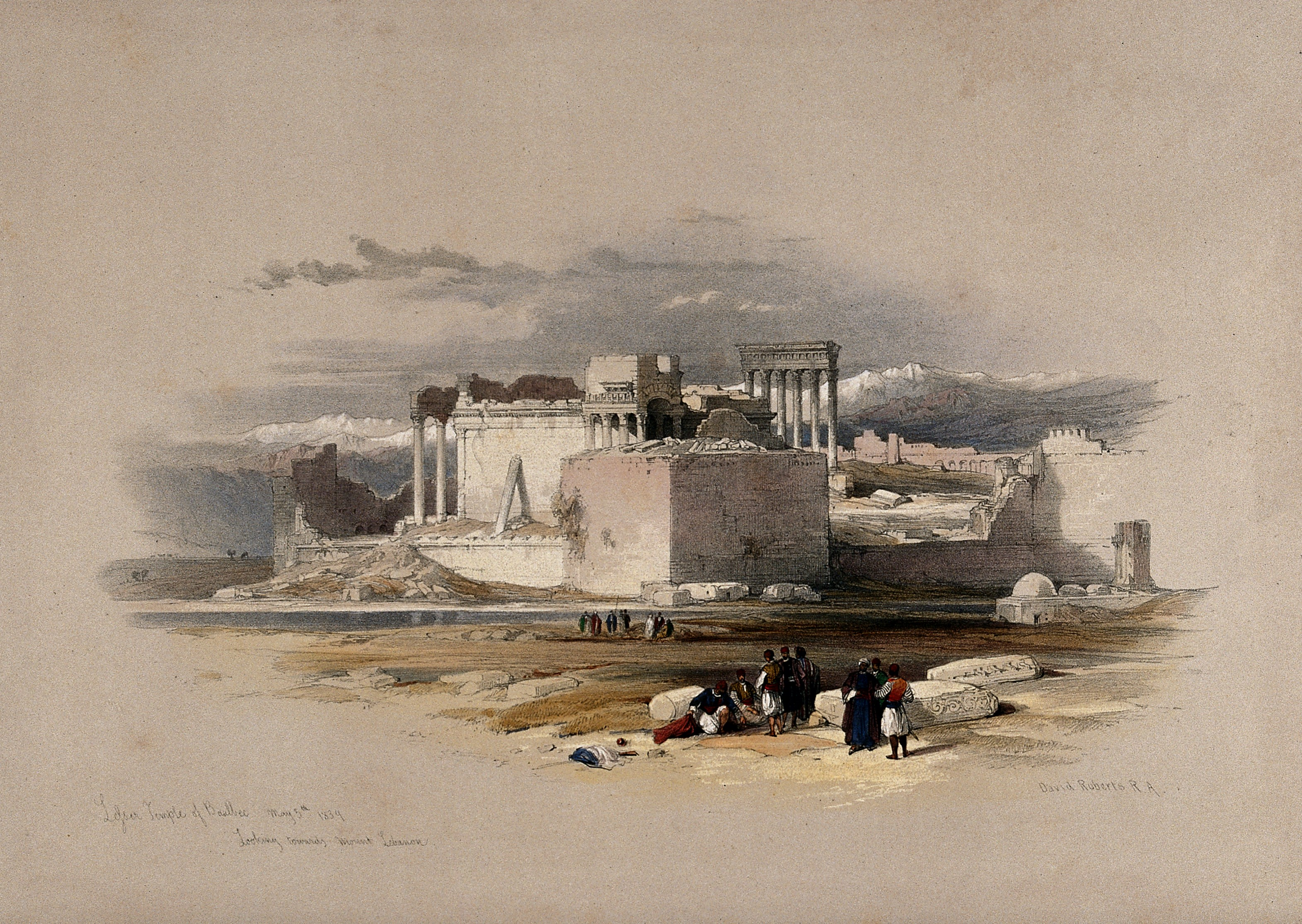
80. Baalbec, looking towards Lebanon.

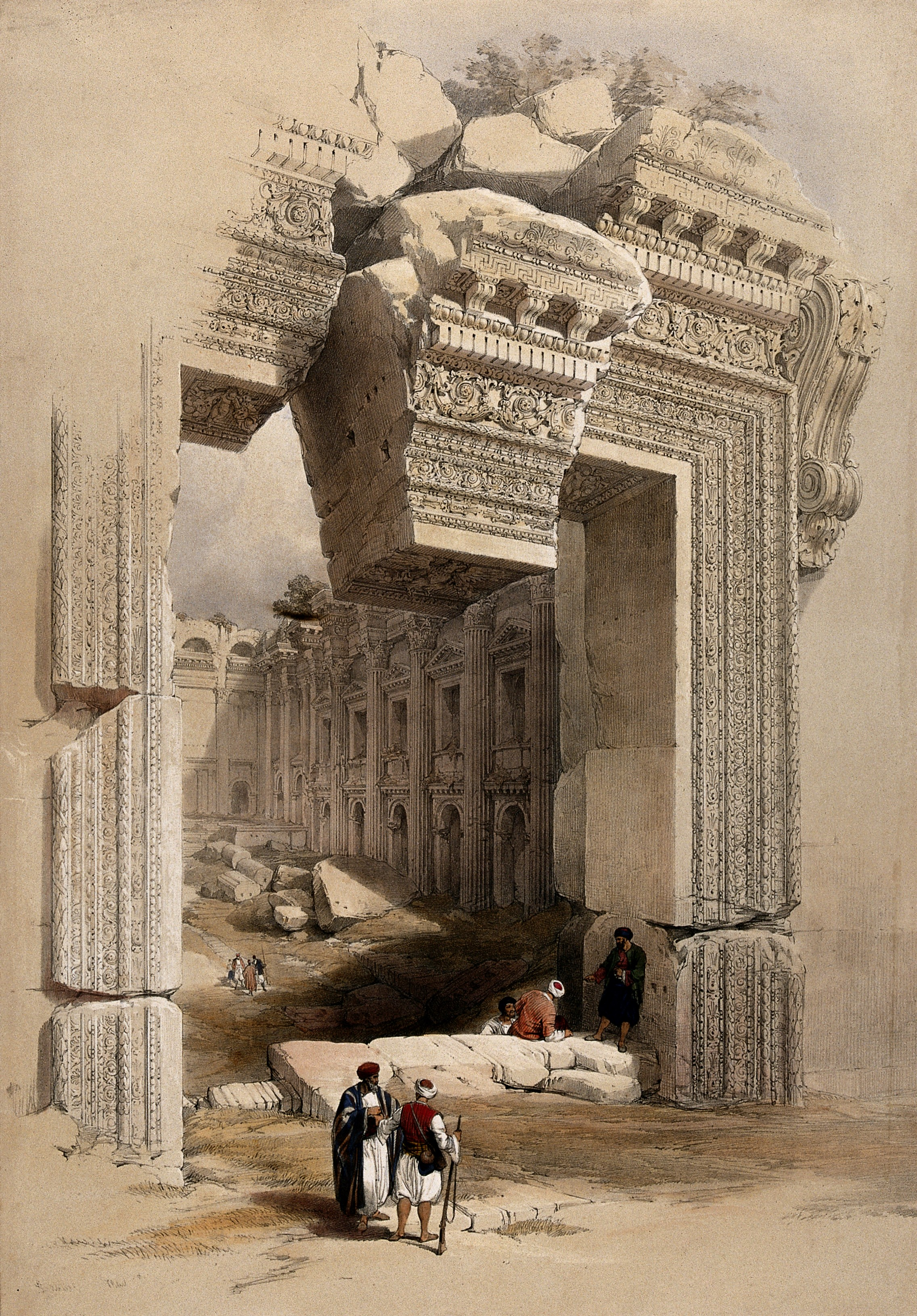
81. The Doorway, Baalbec.

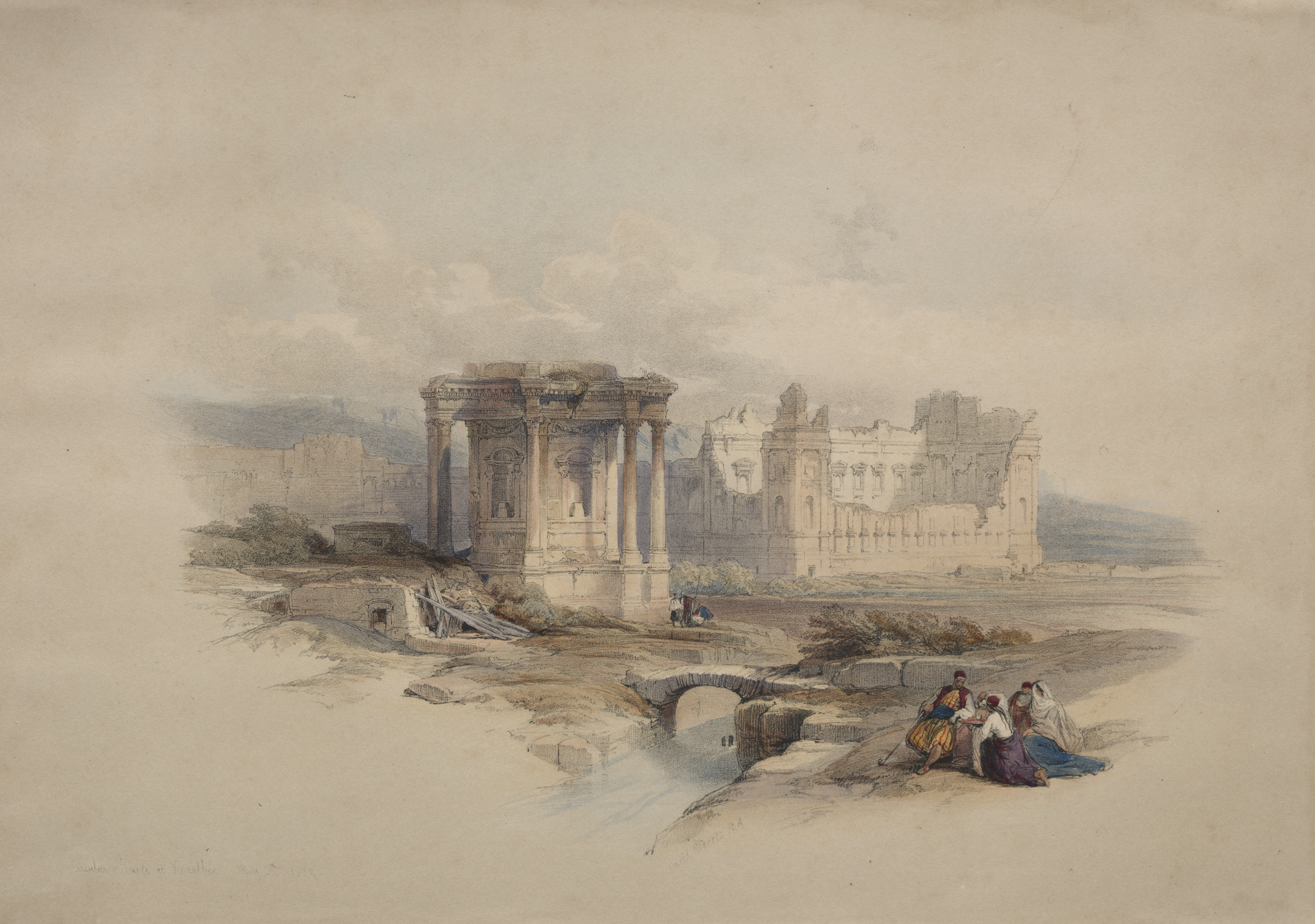
82. The Circular Temple, Baalbec.

83. Portion of the Eastern Portico, Baalbec.

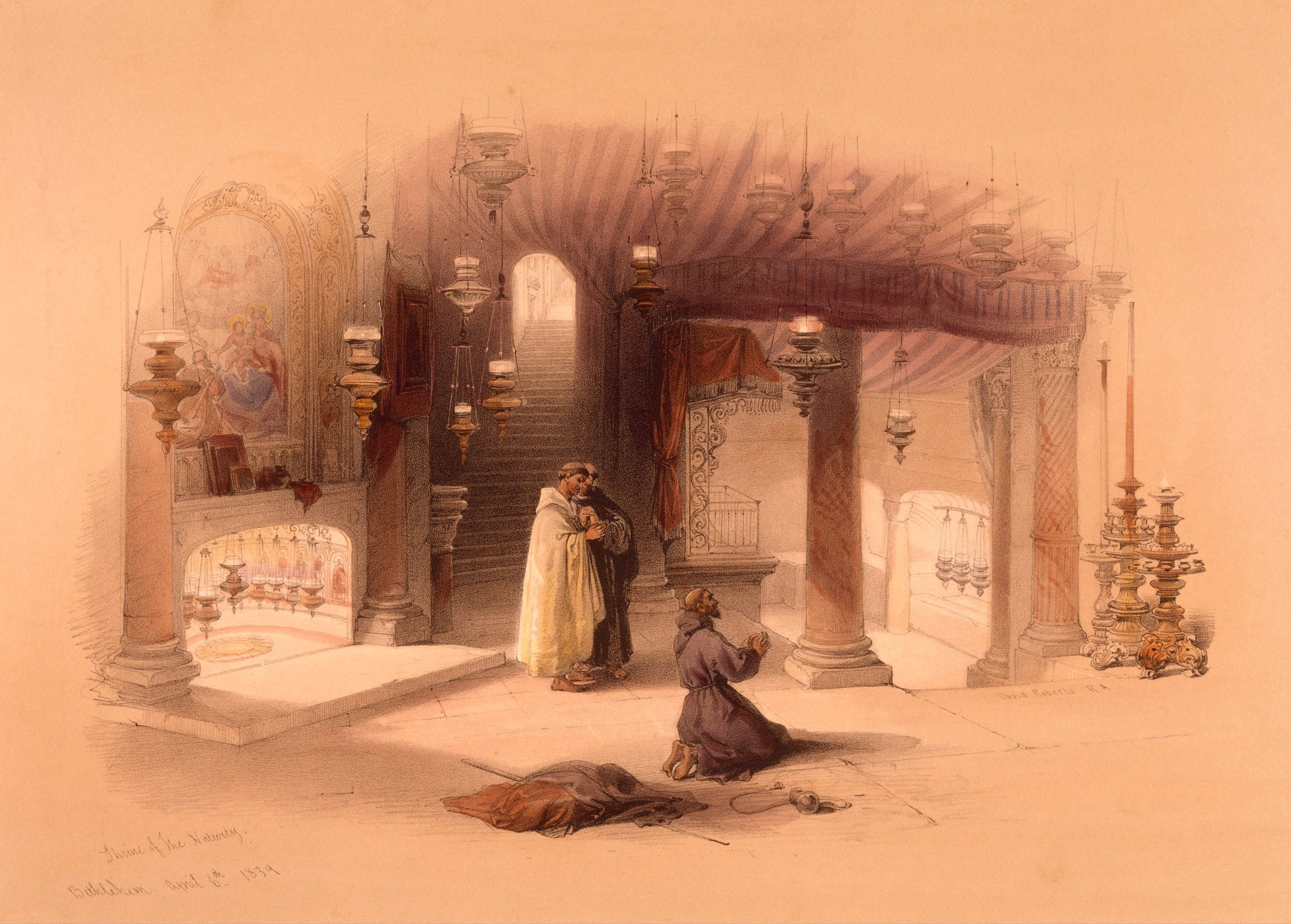
84. Shrine of the Nativity, Bethlehem.

85. Bethlehem.

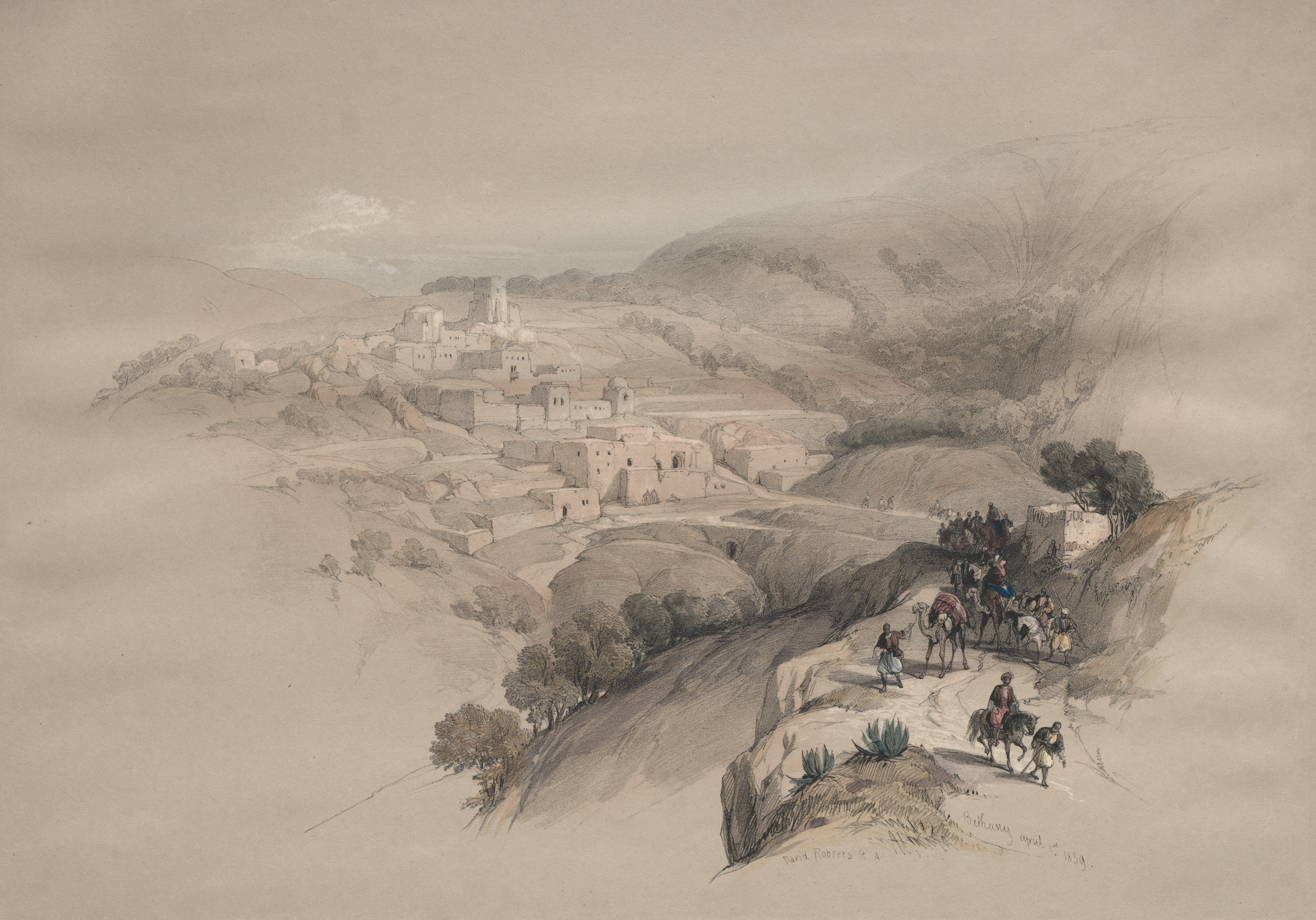
86. Bethany.

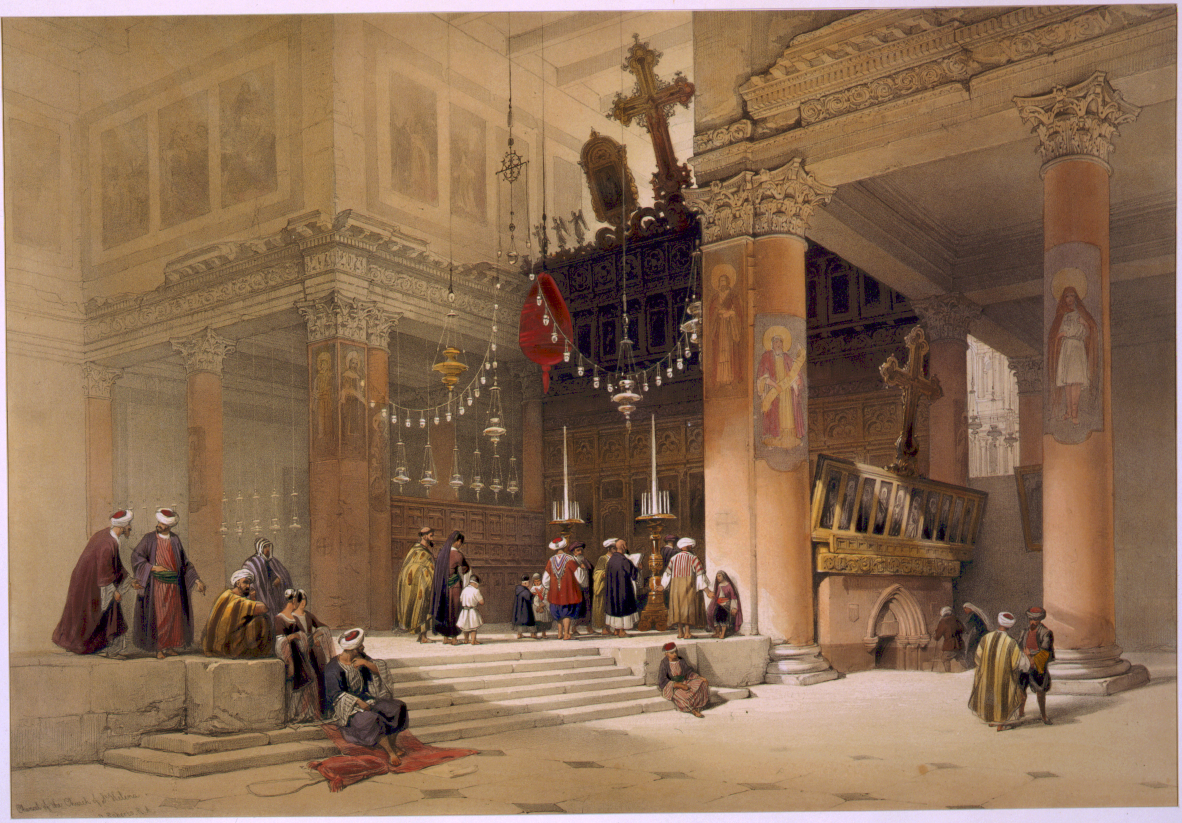
87. Chancel of the Church of St. Helena

=== Volume 3 ===
88. Title page. Temple of El-Khasne, Petra.

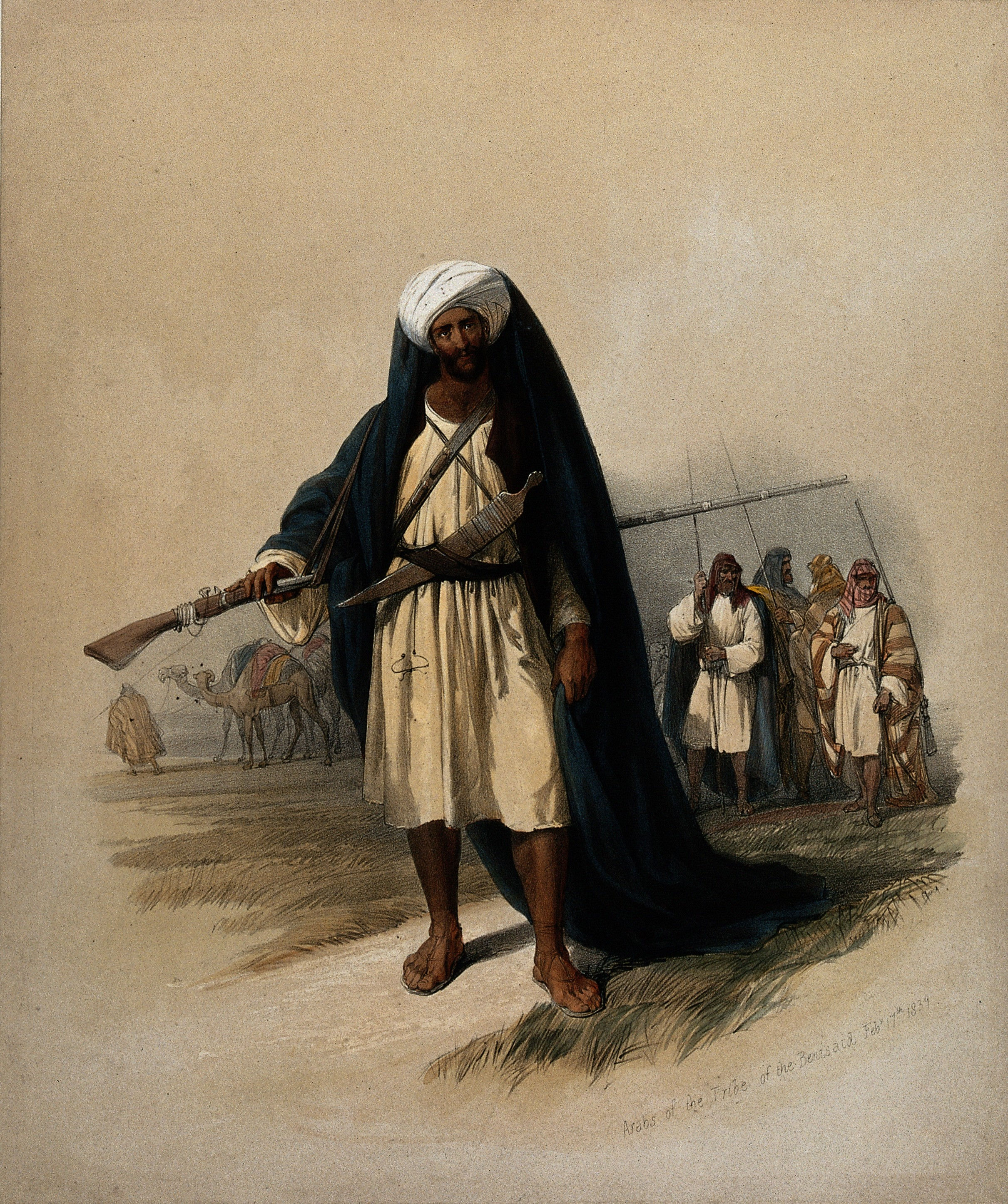
89. Arabs of the Desert.

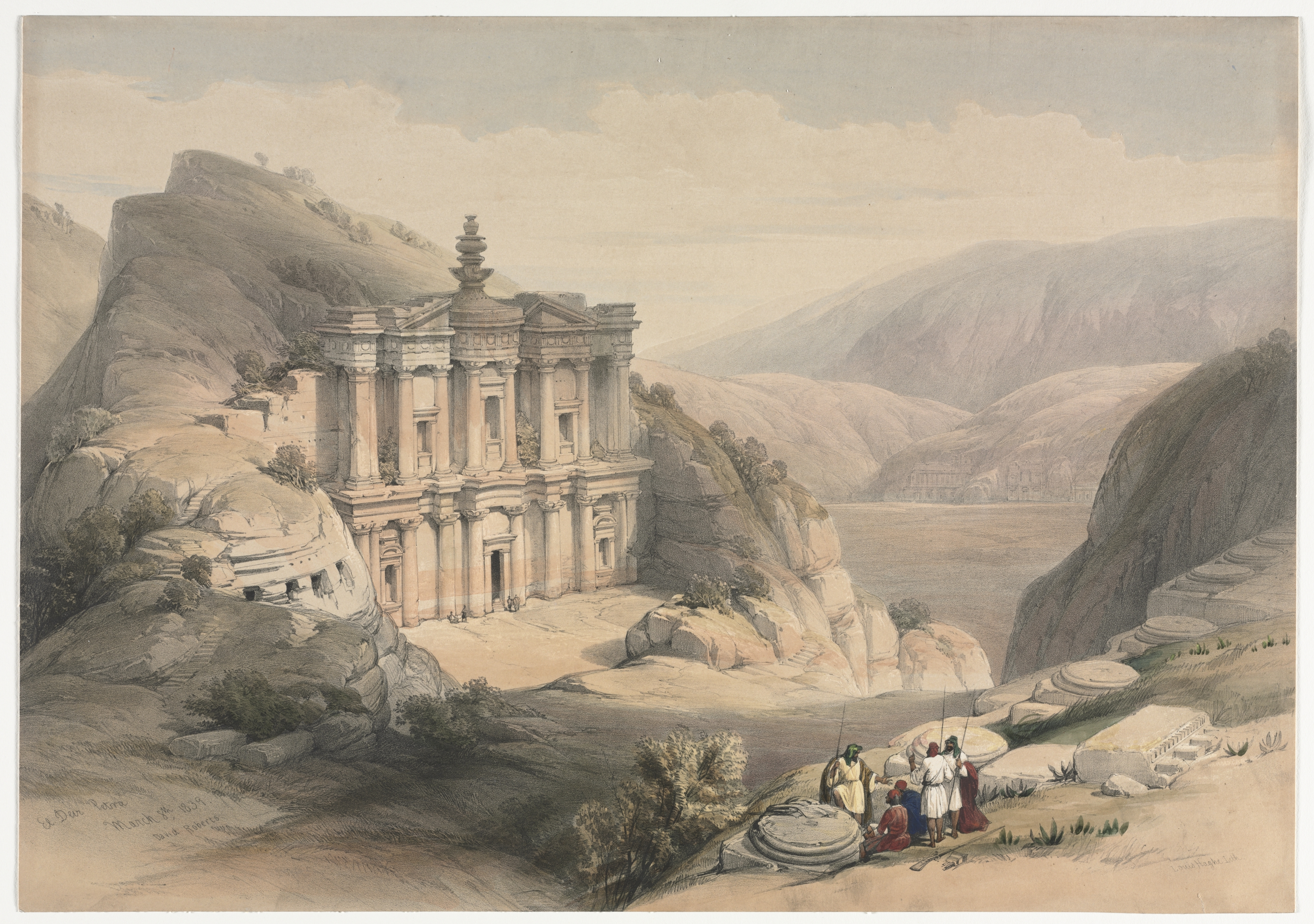
90. El-Deir, Petra.

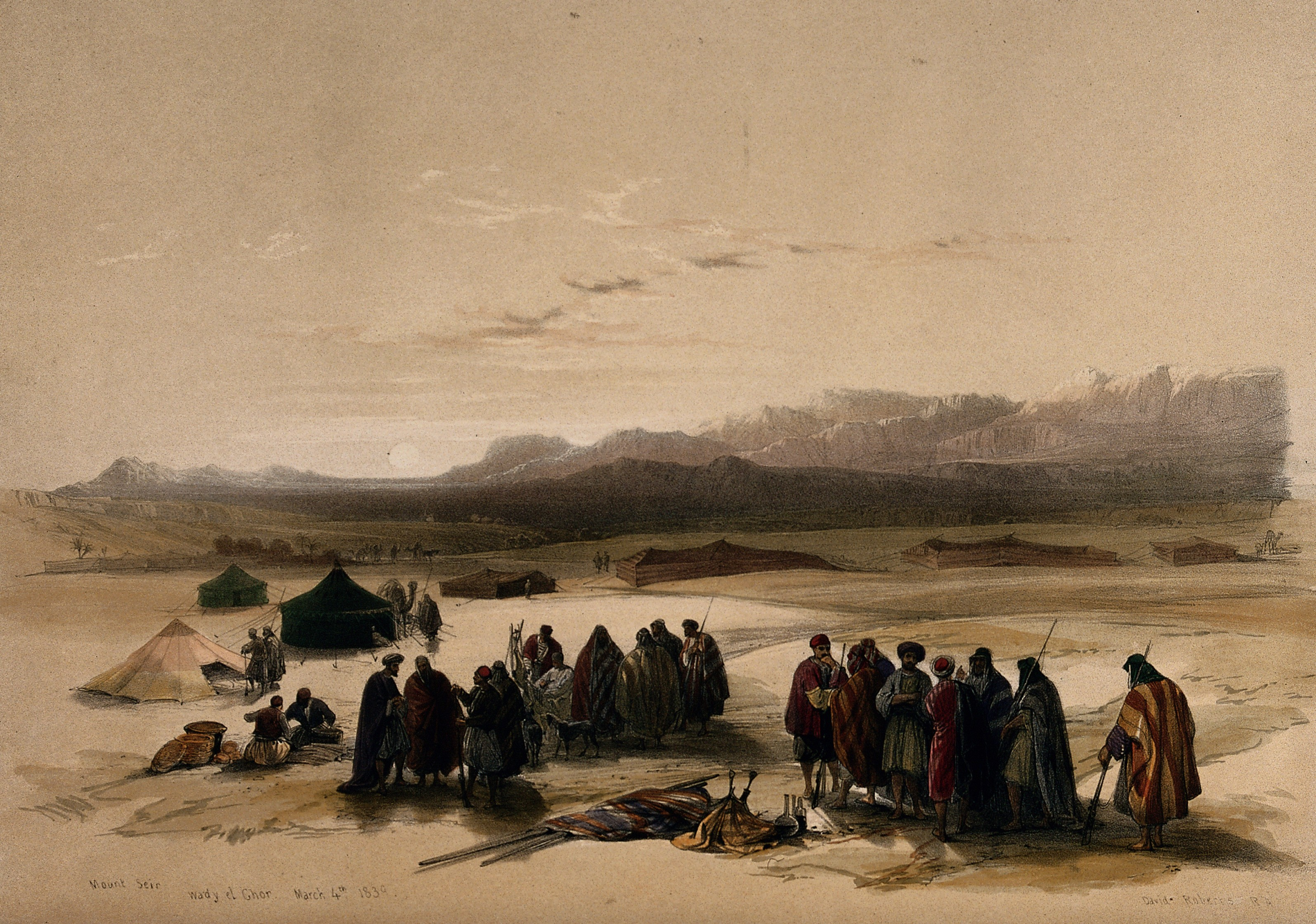
91. Encampment of the Alloeen in Wady-Arabia.

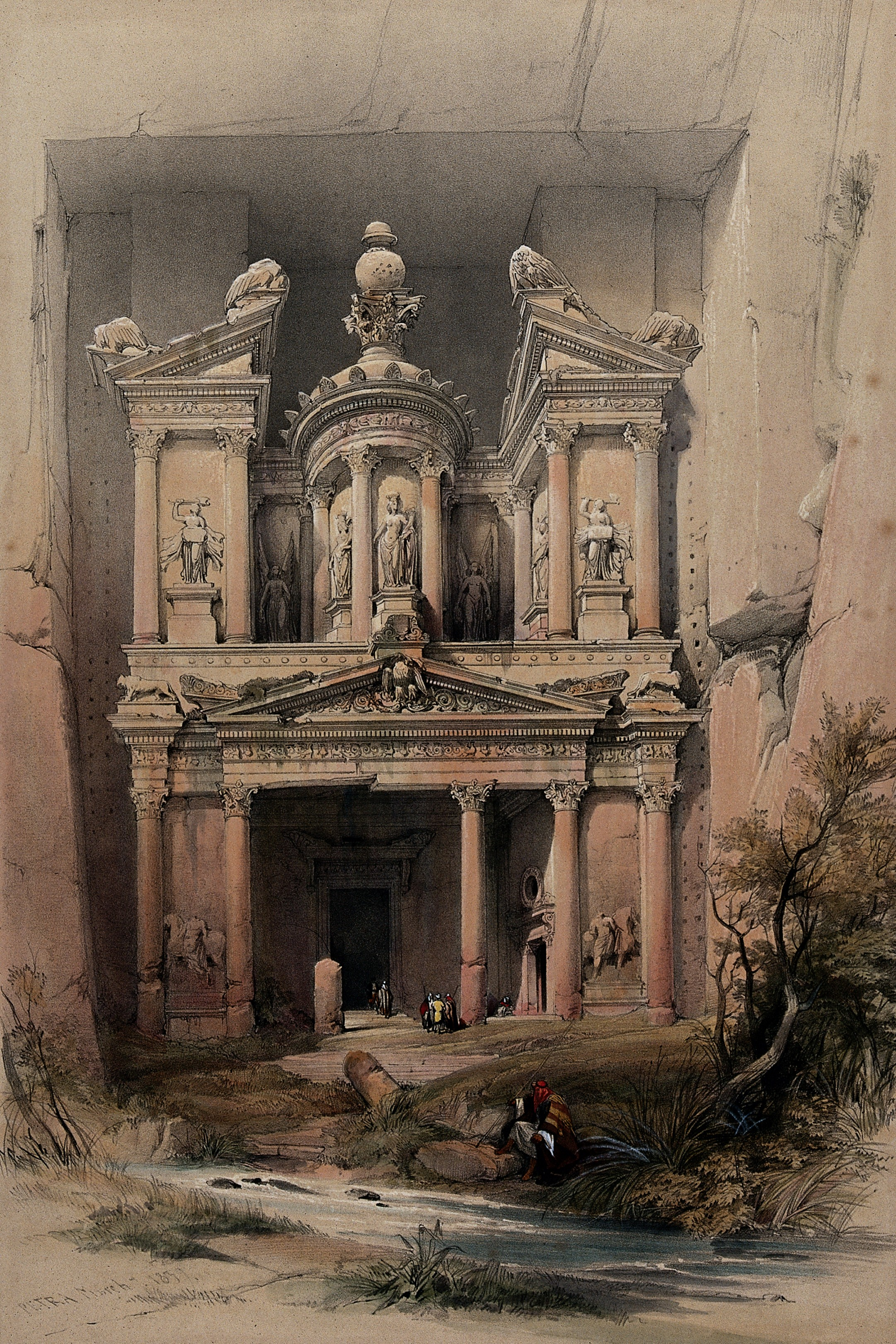
92. El-Khasne, Petra.

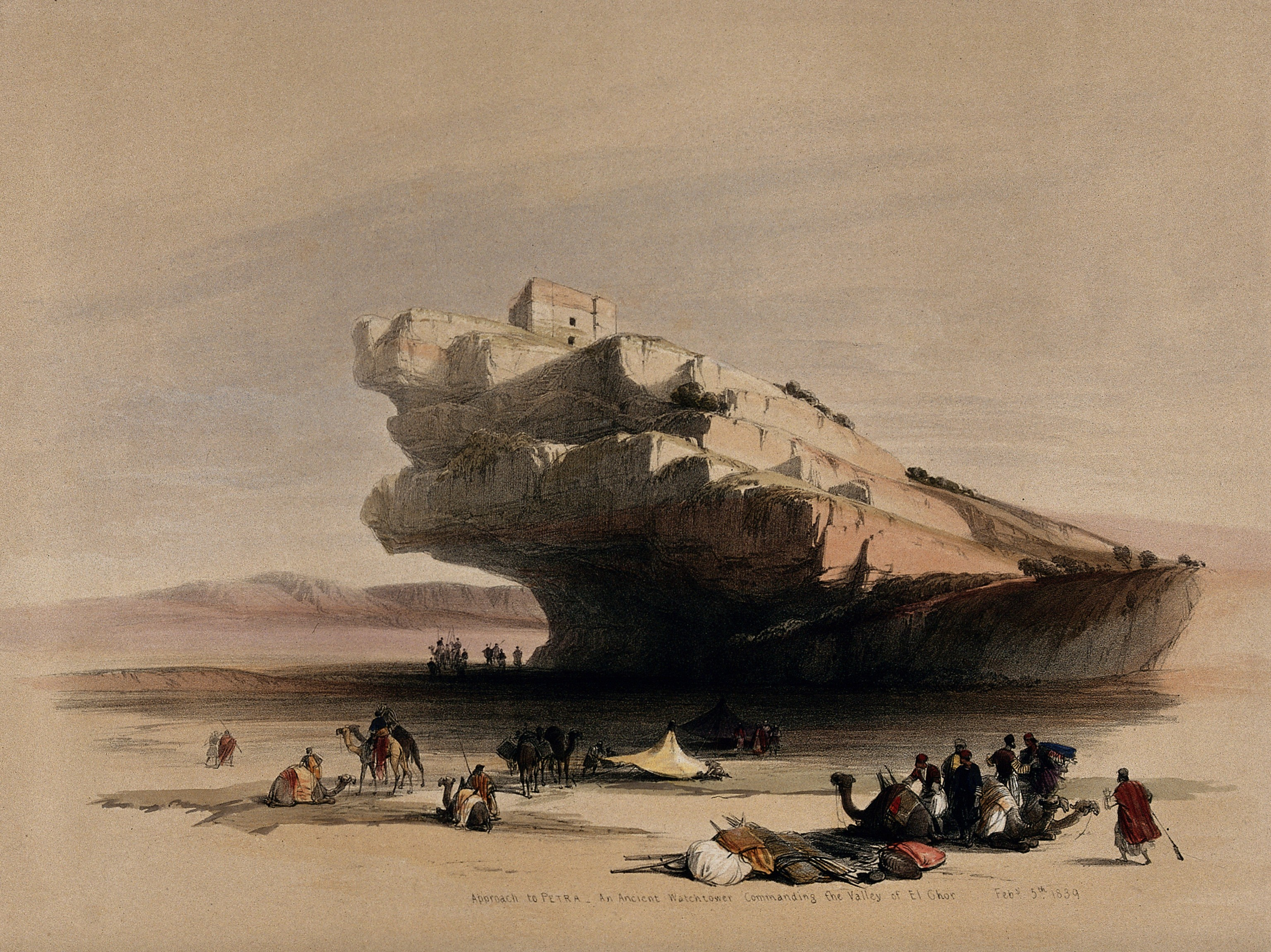
93. Ancient Watch Tower.

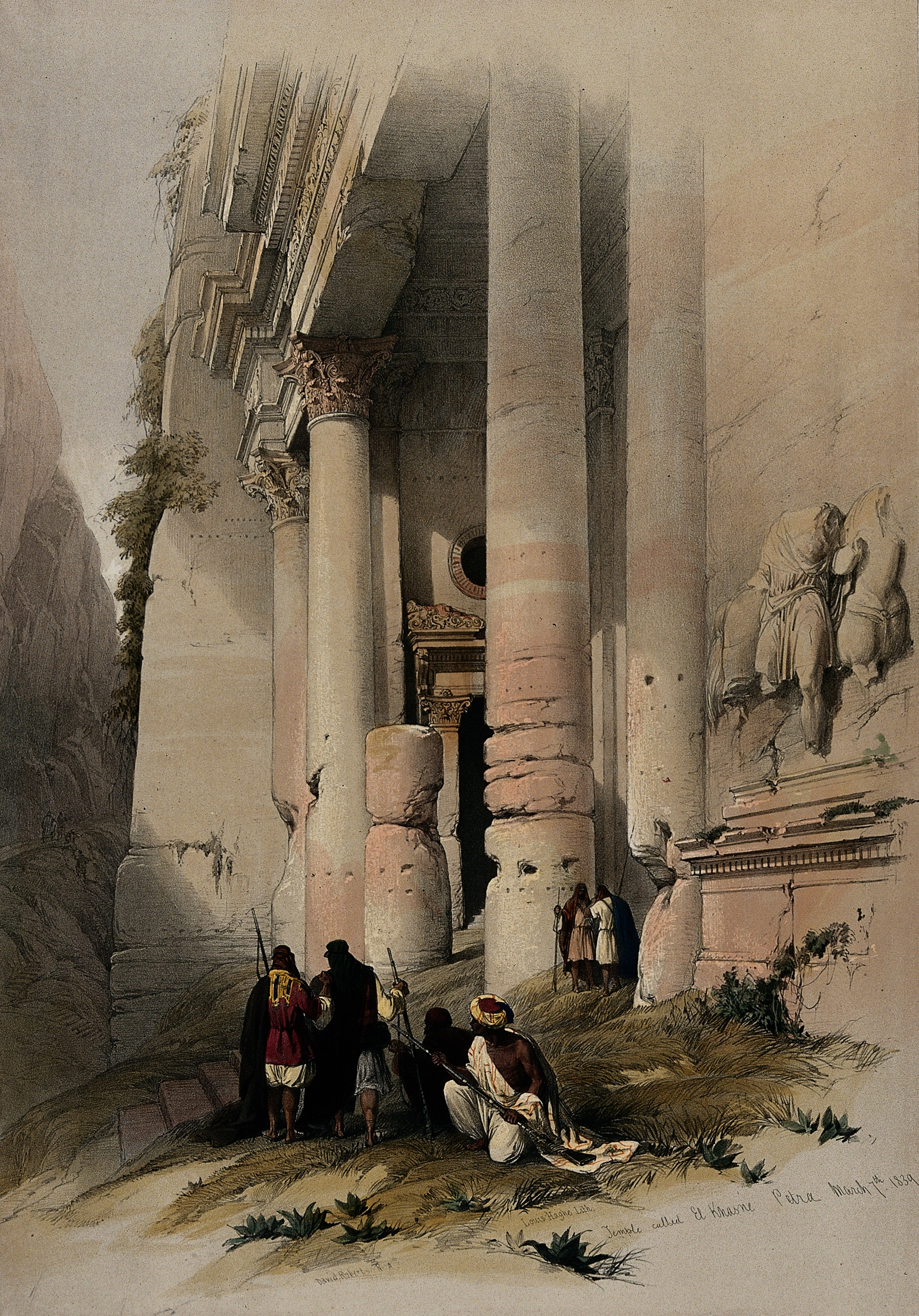
94. Lower Portion of El-Khasne, Petra.

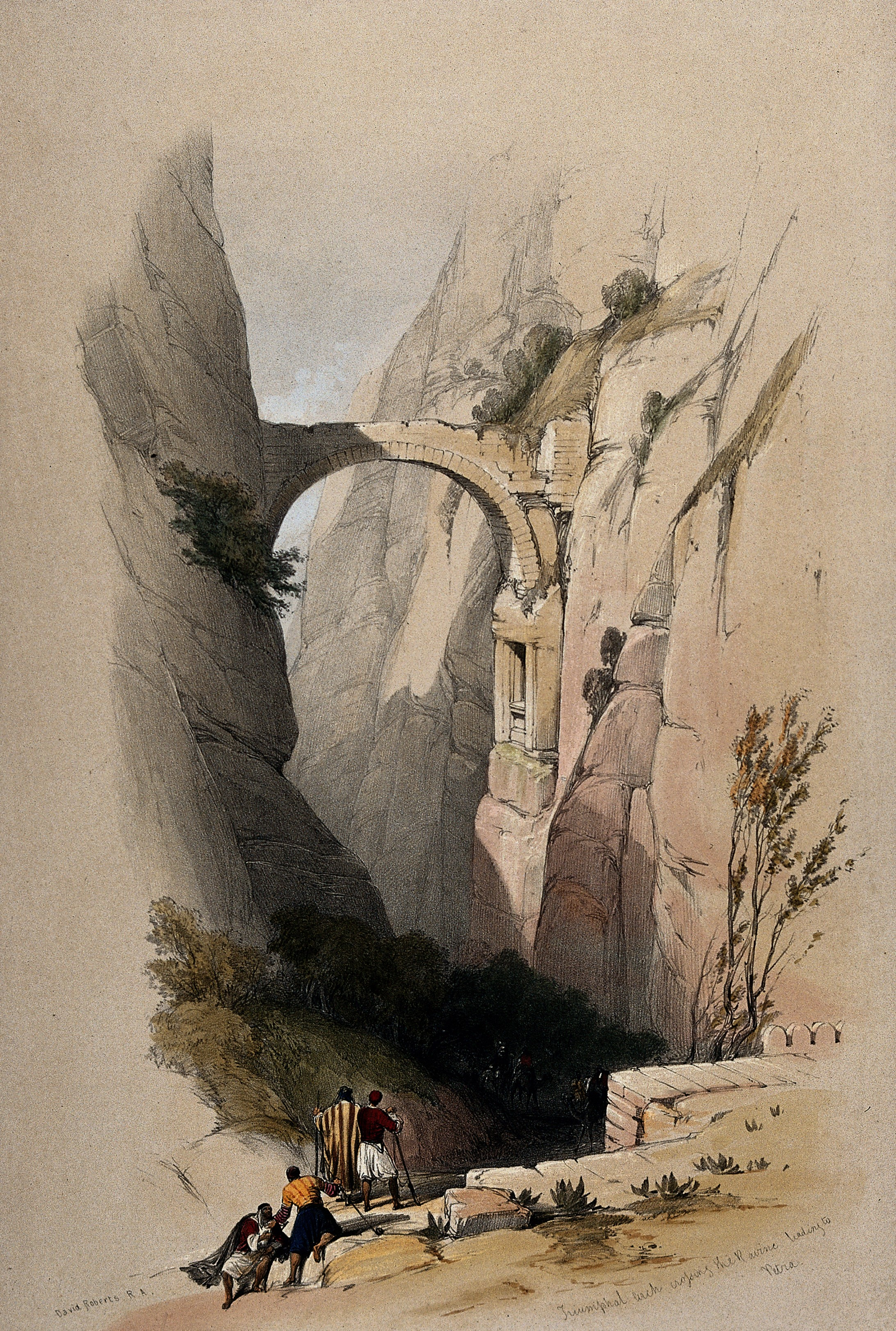
95. The arch across the ravine, Petra.

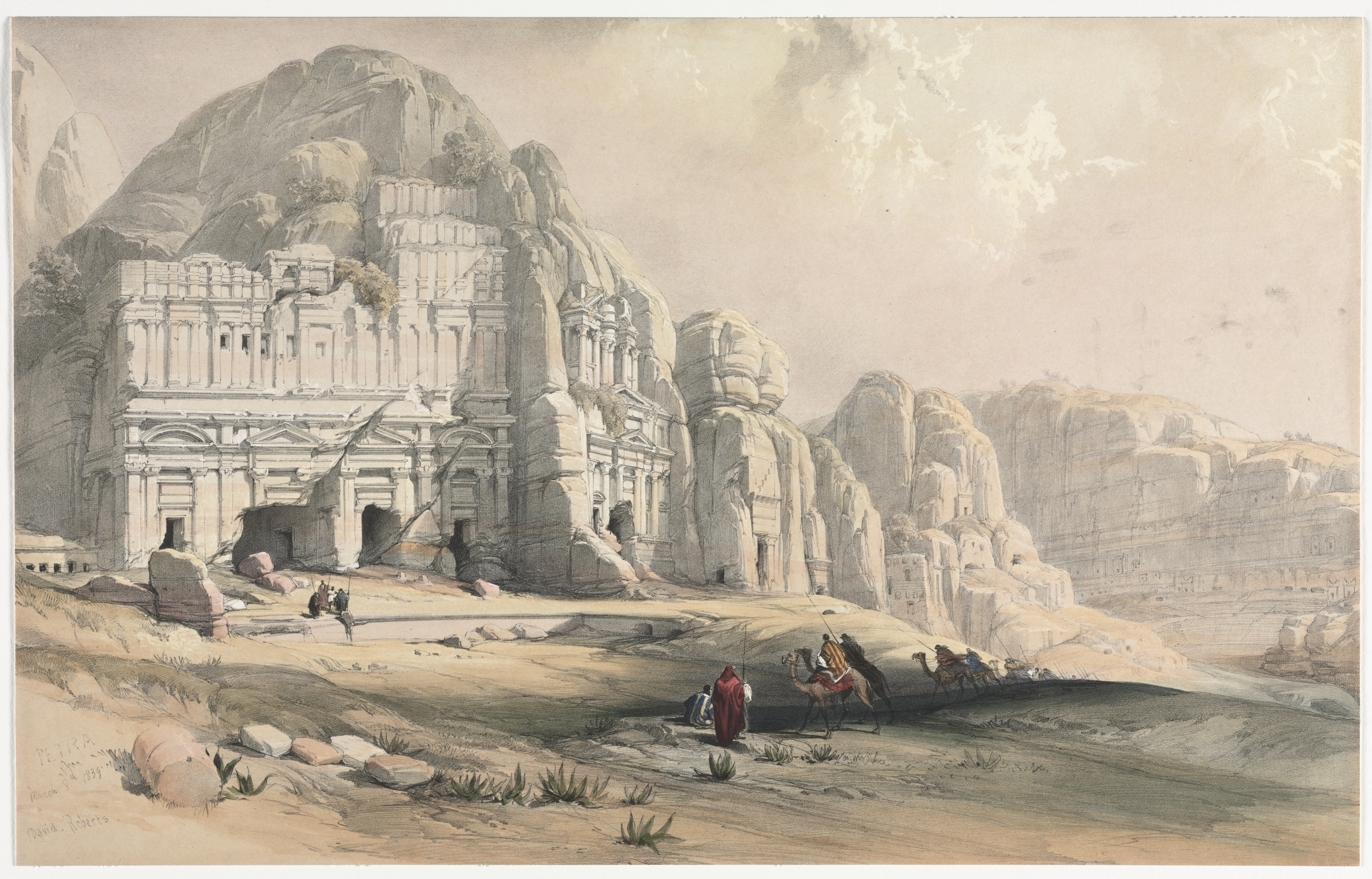
96. Petra, showing the Upper or Eastern End of the Valley.

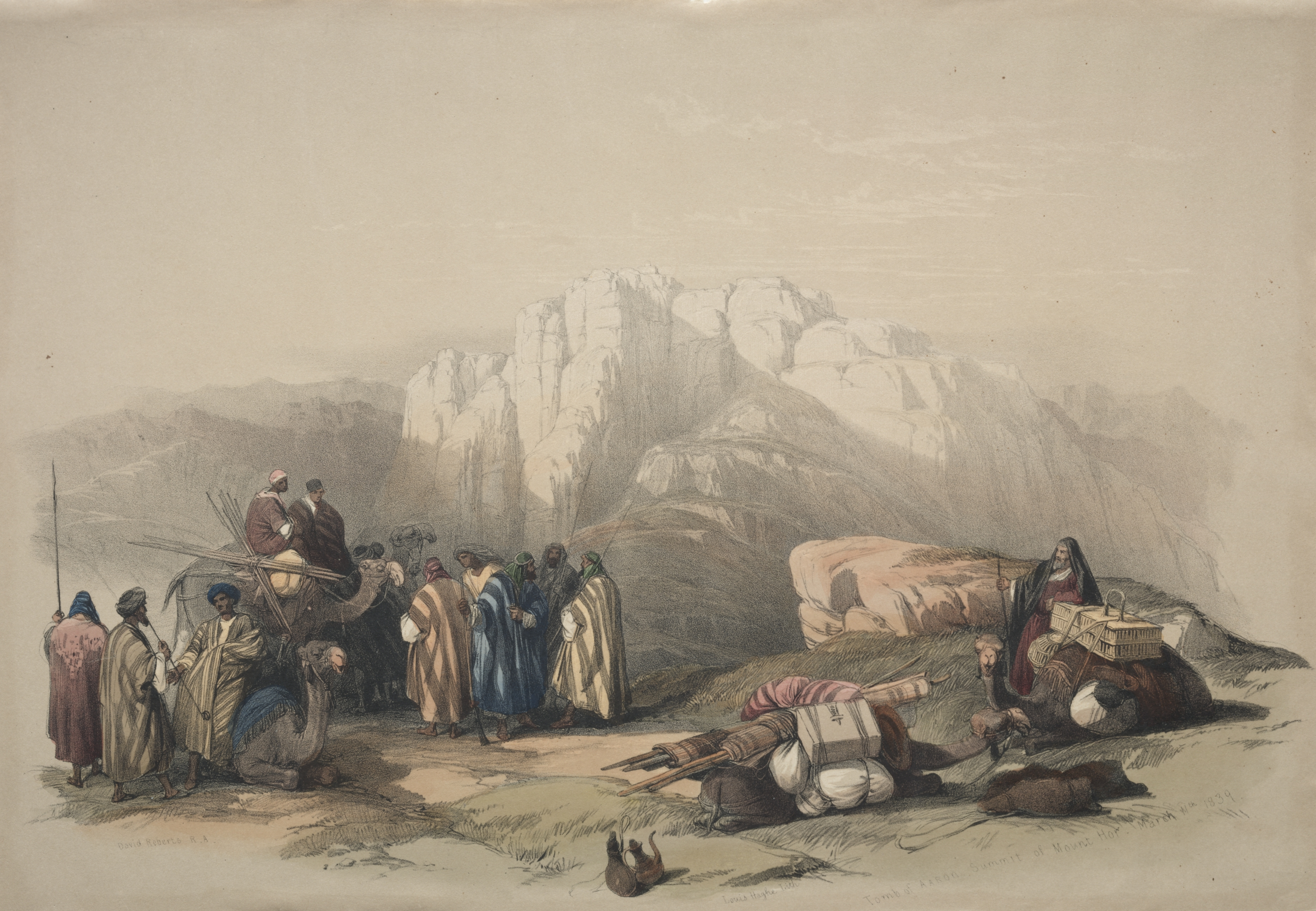
97. Tomb of Aaron, summit of Mount Horeb.

98. The Theatre, Petra.

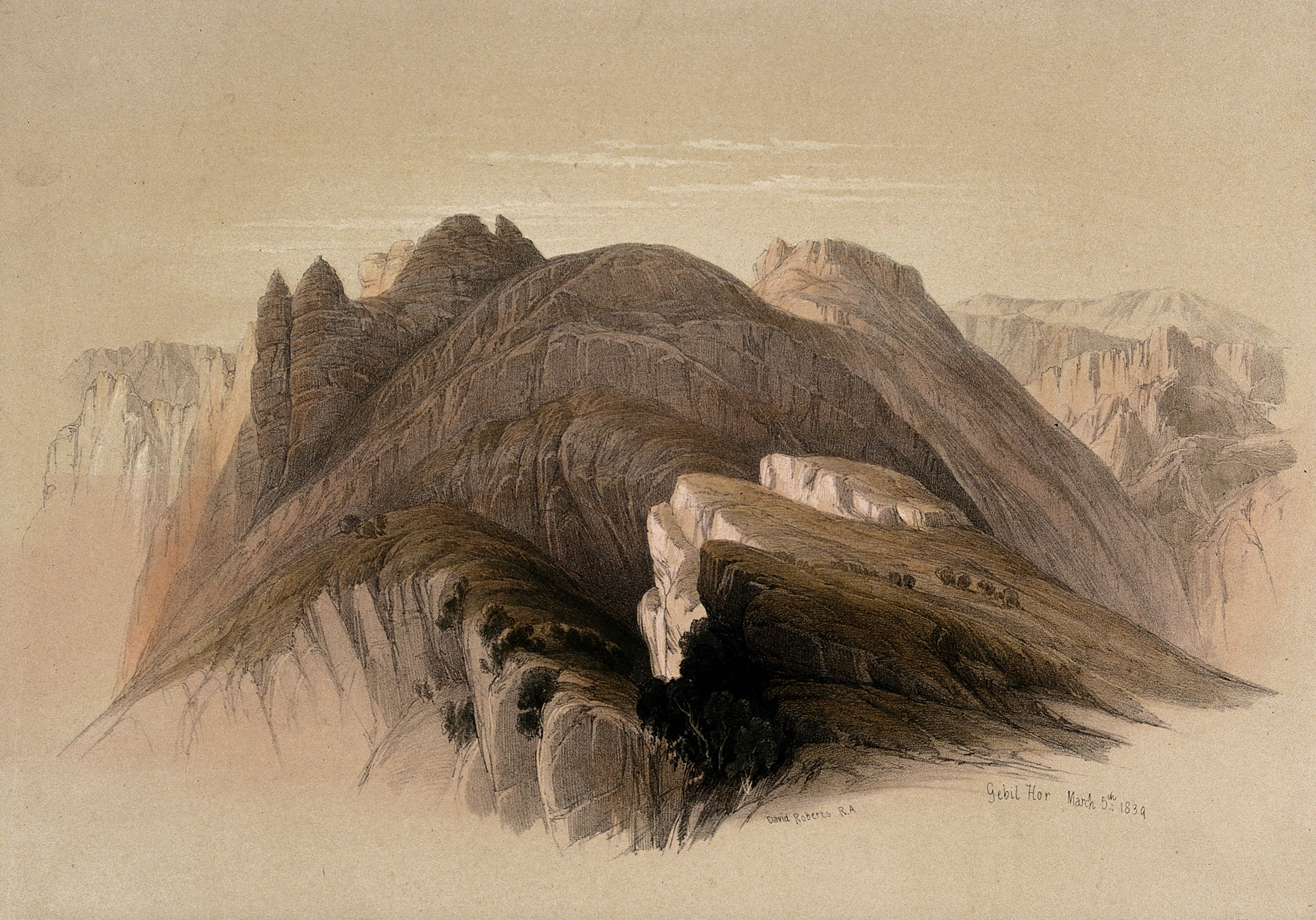
99. Mount Hor, from the cliffs encircling Petra.

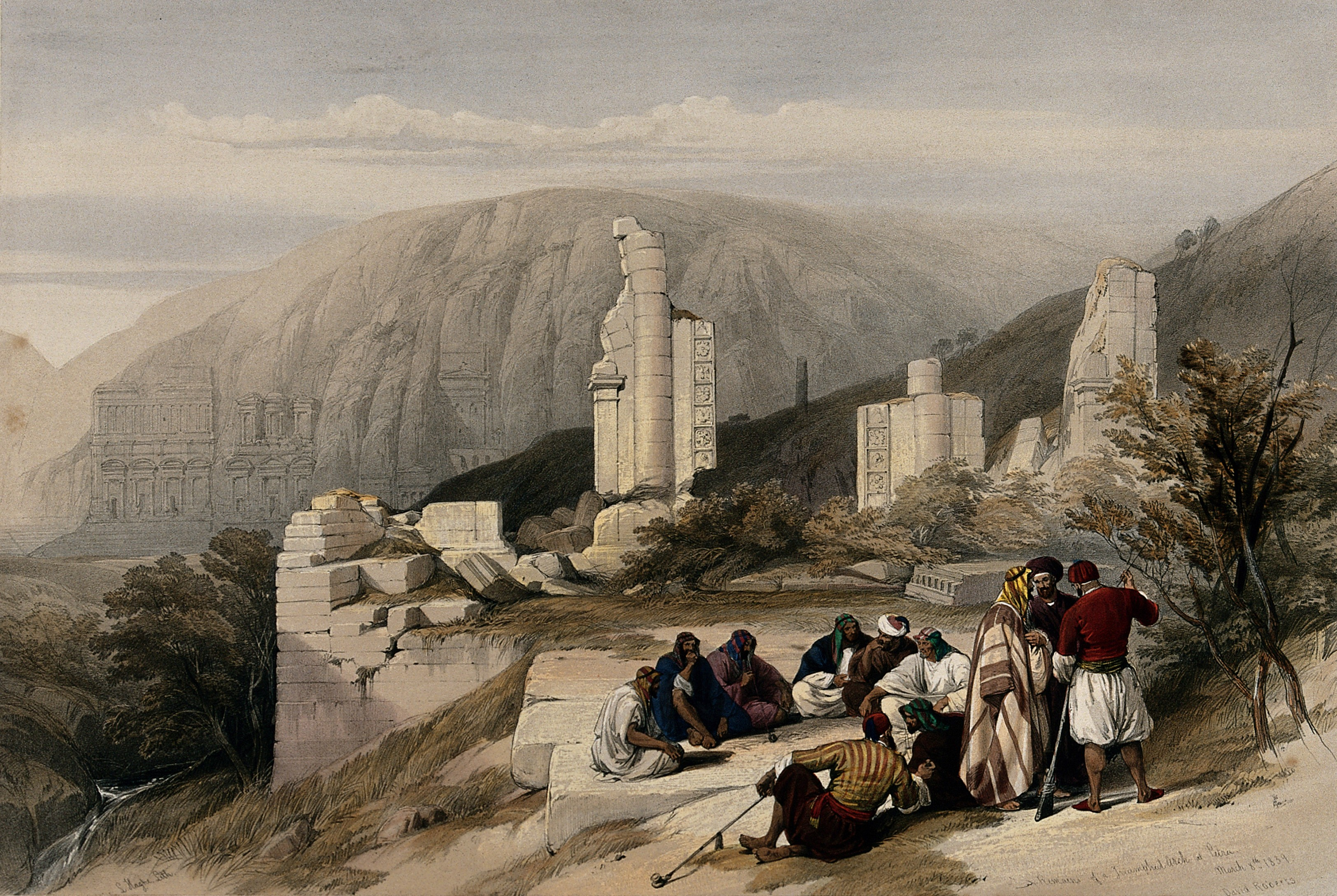
100. Remains of a triumphal arch at Petra.

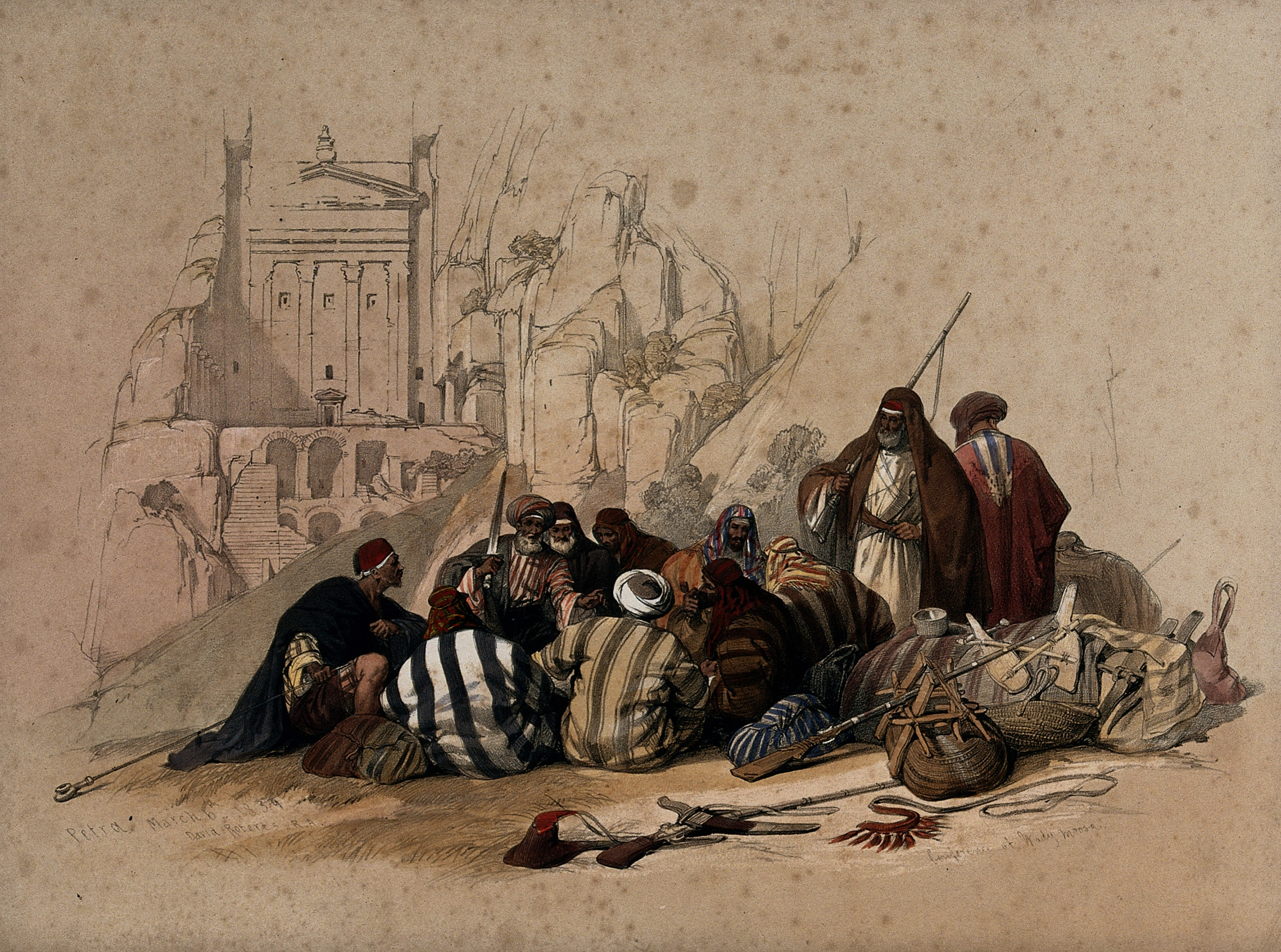
101. Conference of Arabs.

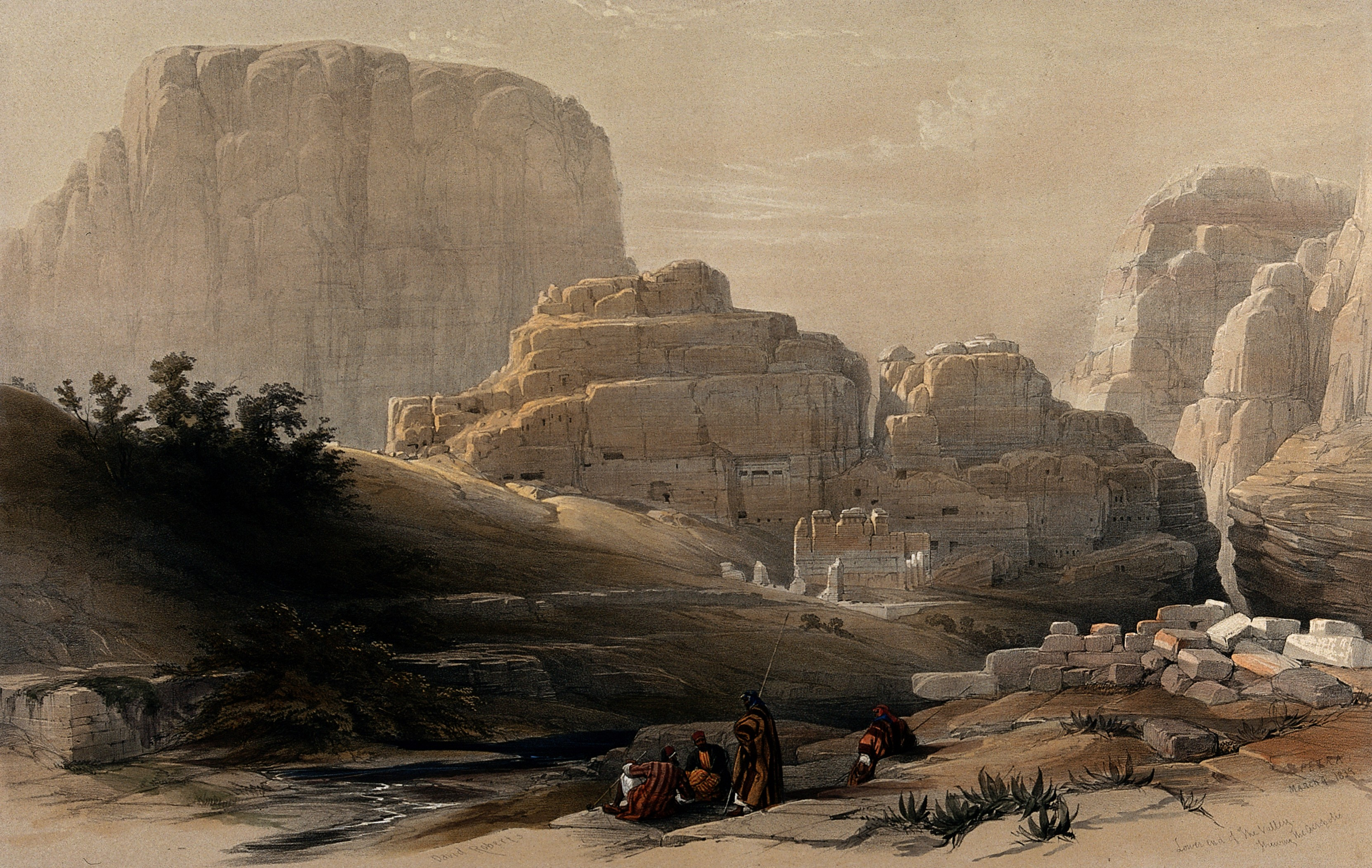
102. The Acropolis (Kusr Faron) Lower End of the Valley.

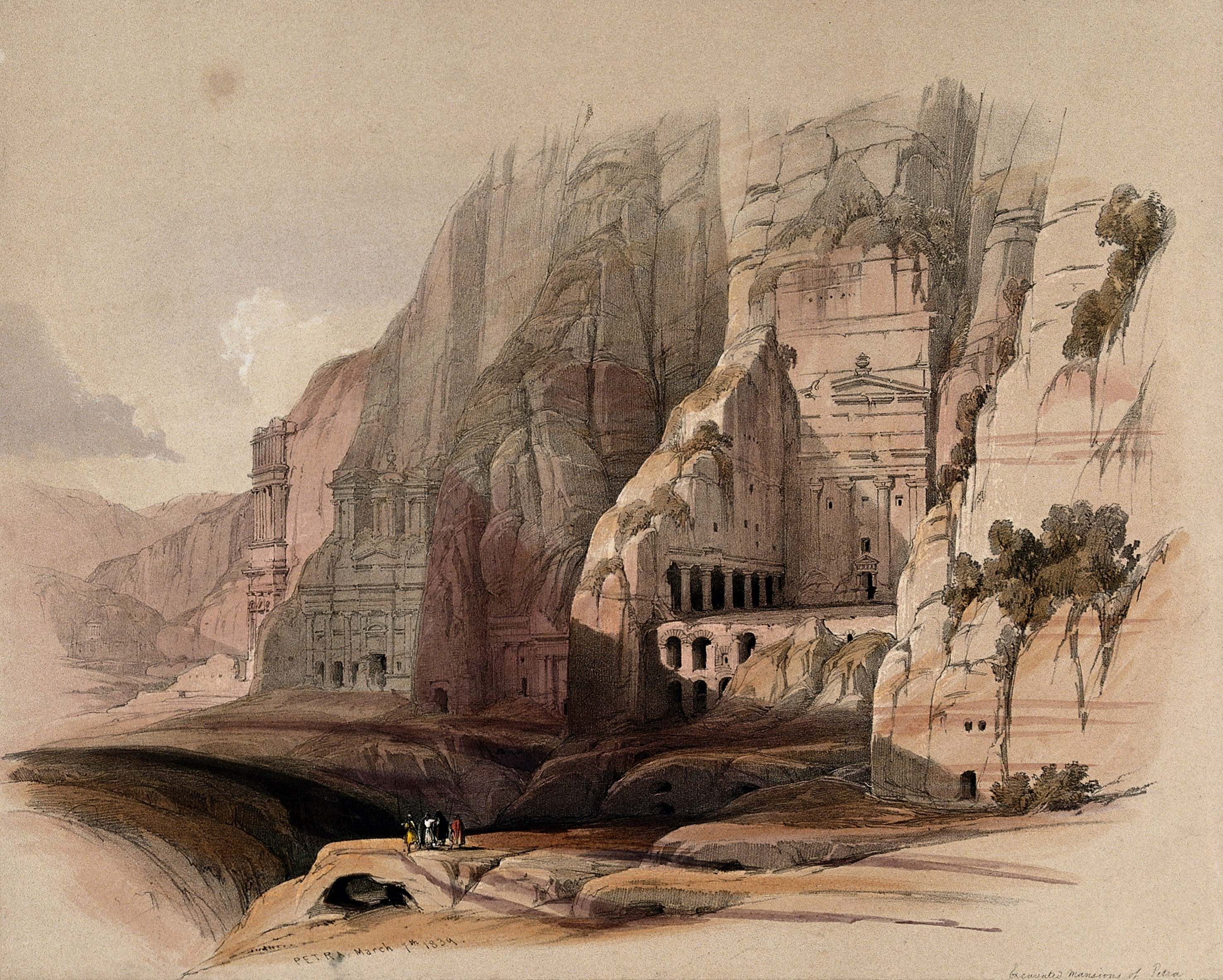
103. Excavations at the Eastern End of the Valley, Petra.

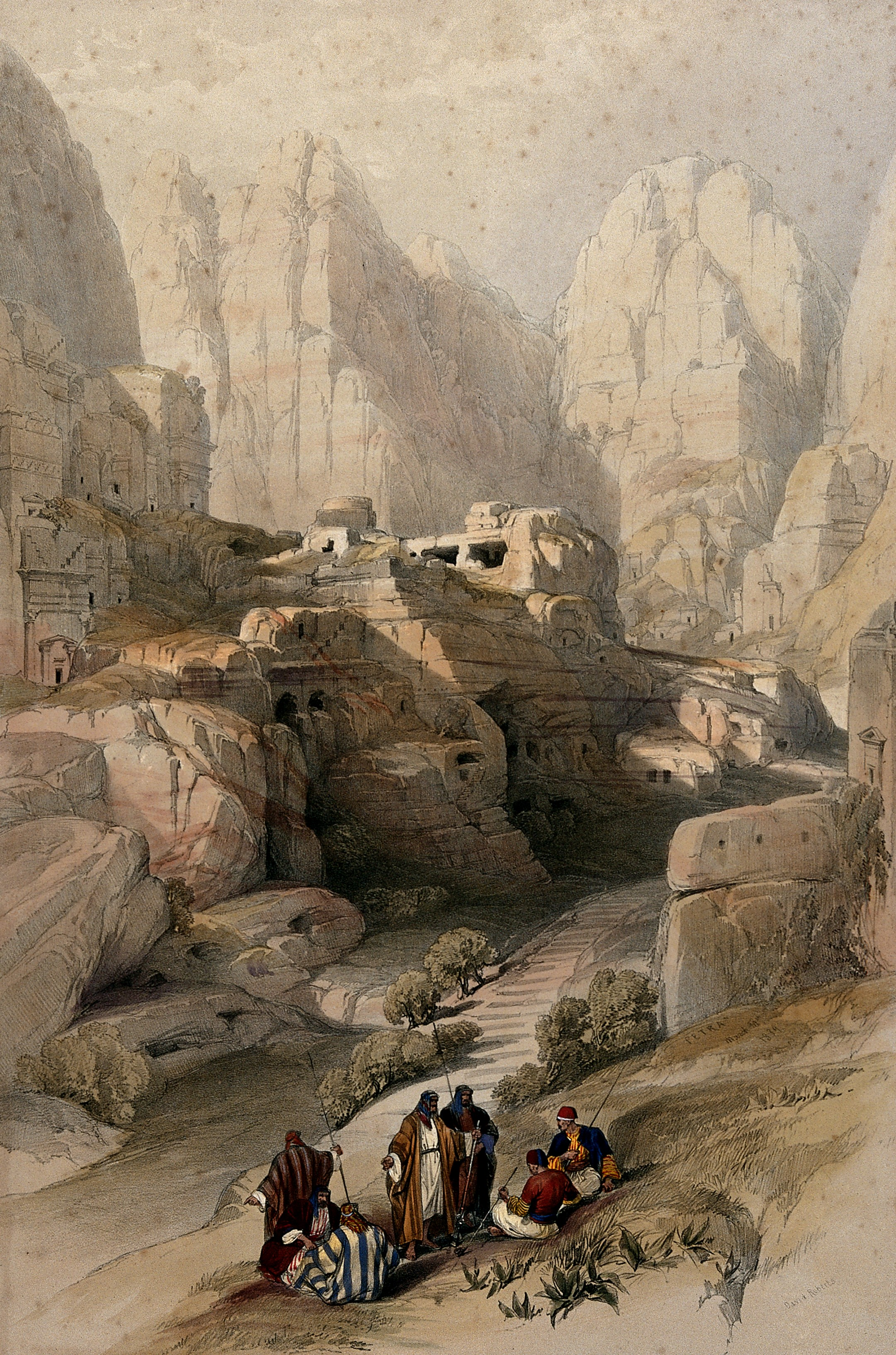
104. The Ravine, Petra.

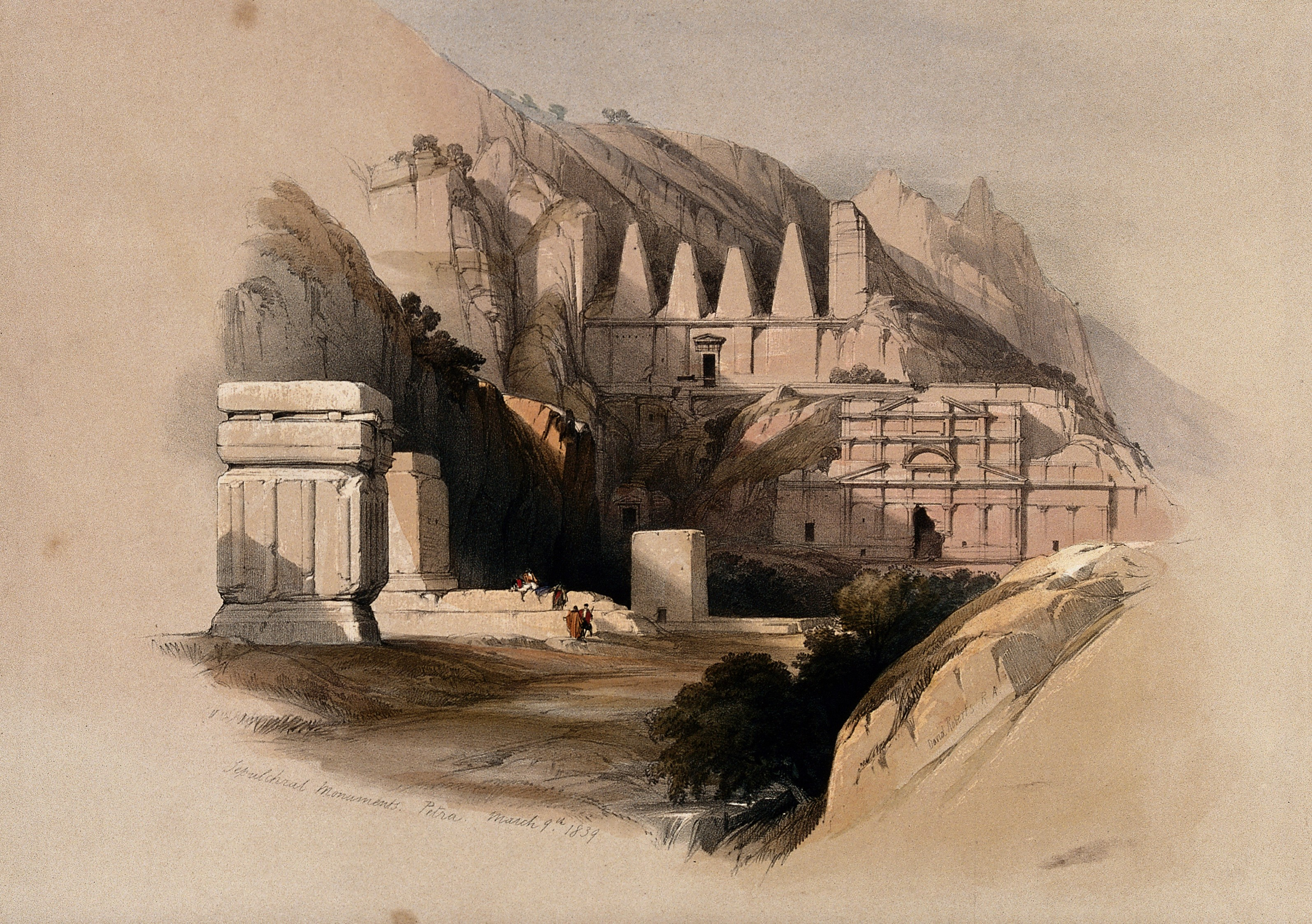
105. The Necropolis.

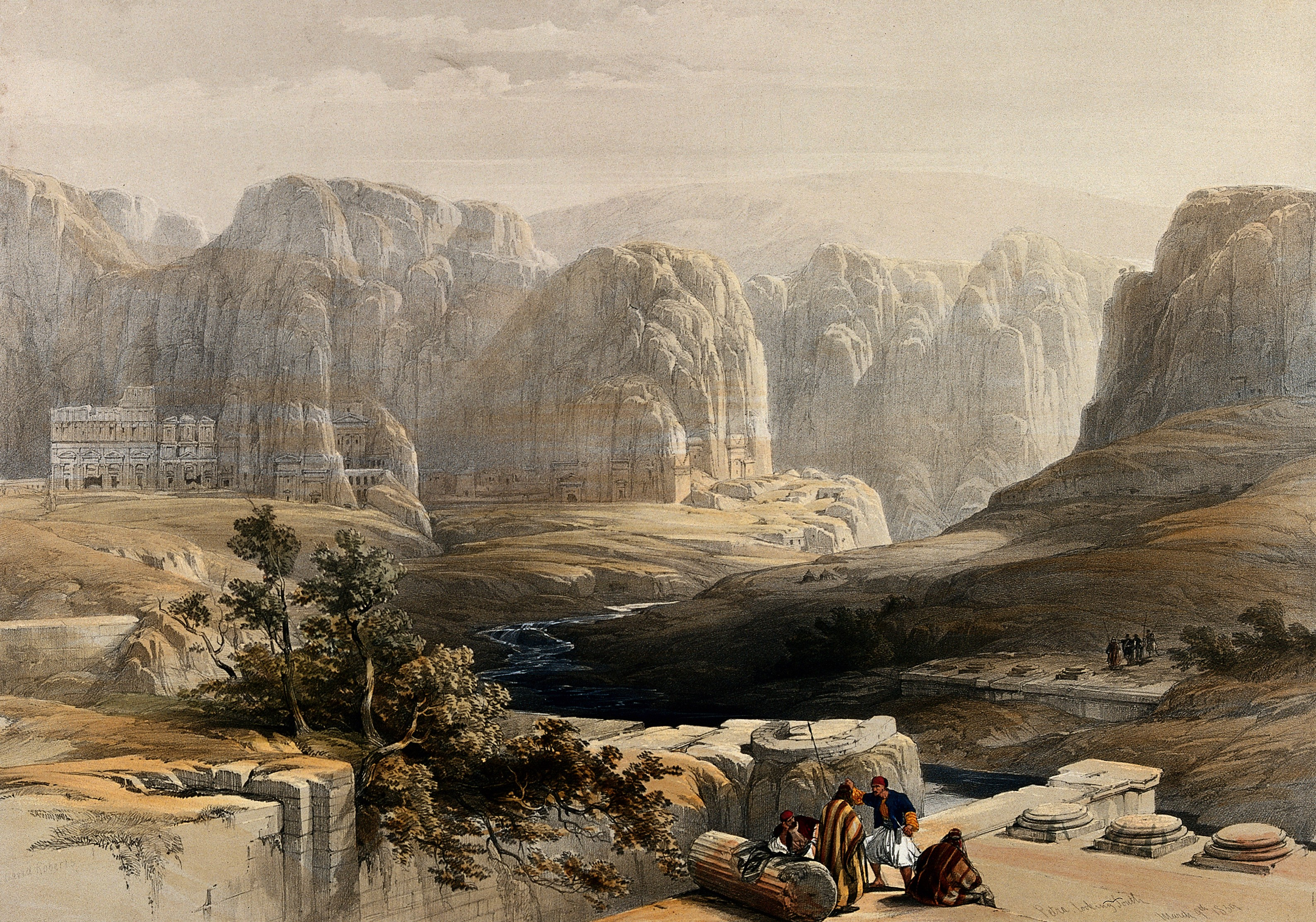
106. Site of Petra, South.

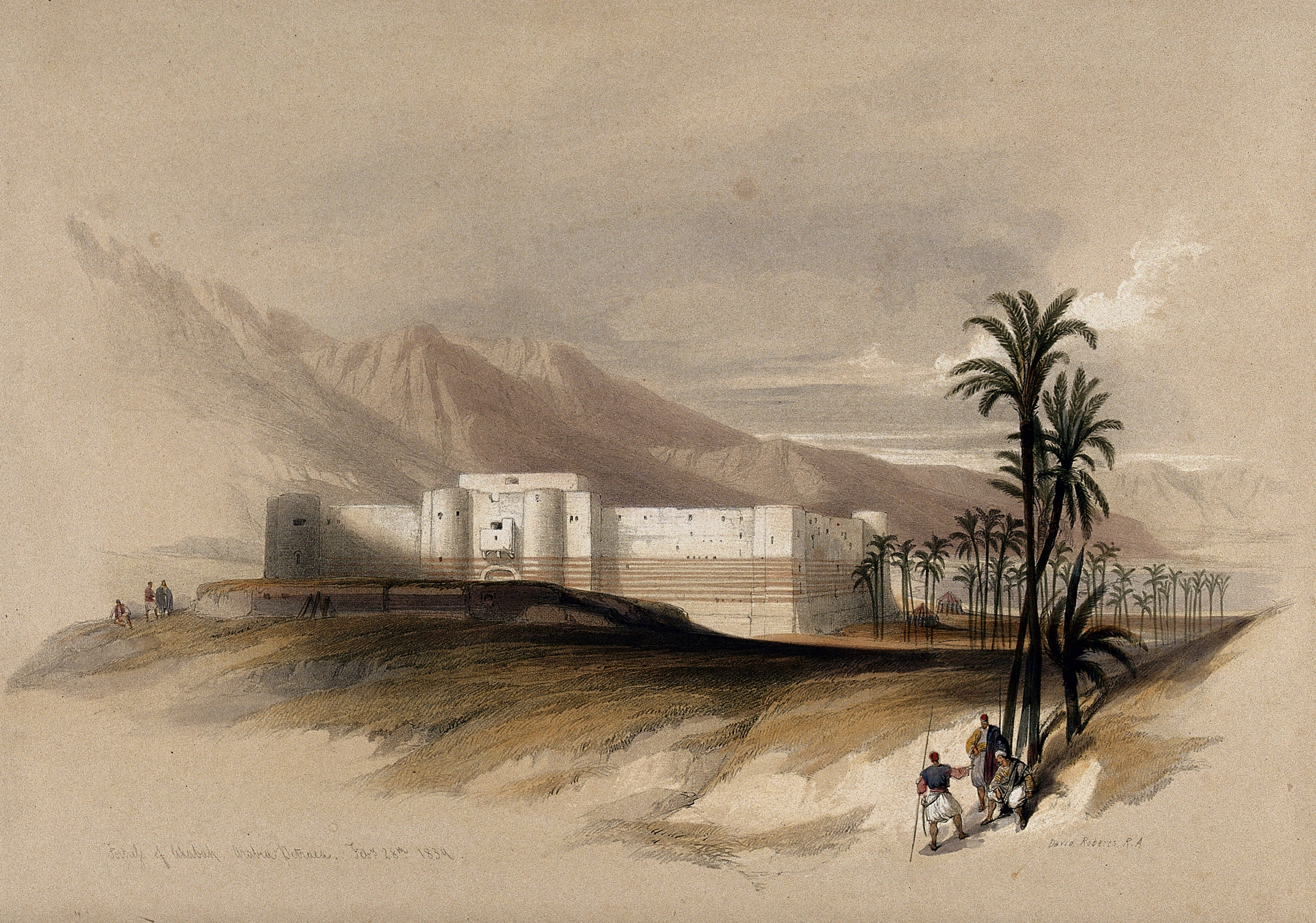
107. Fortress of Akabah, Arabia Petraea.

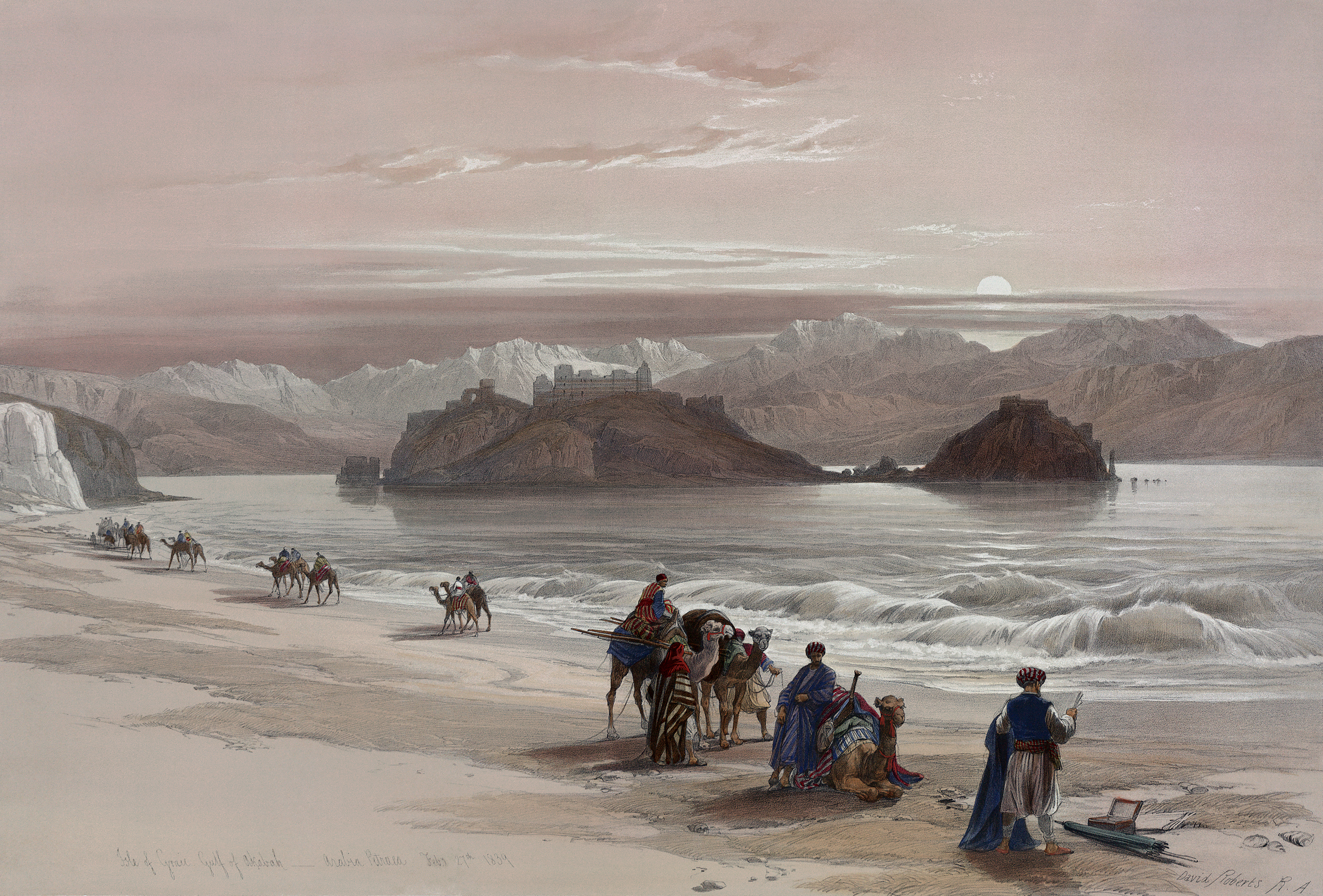
108. Island of Graia, Gulf of Akabah.

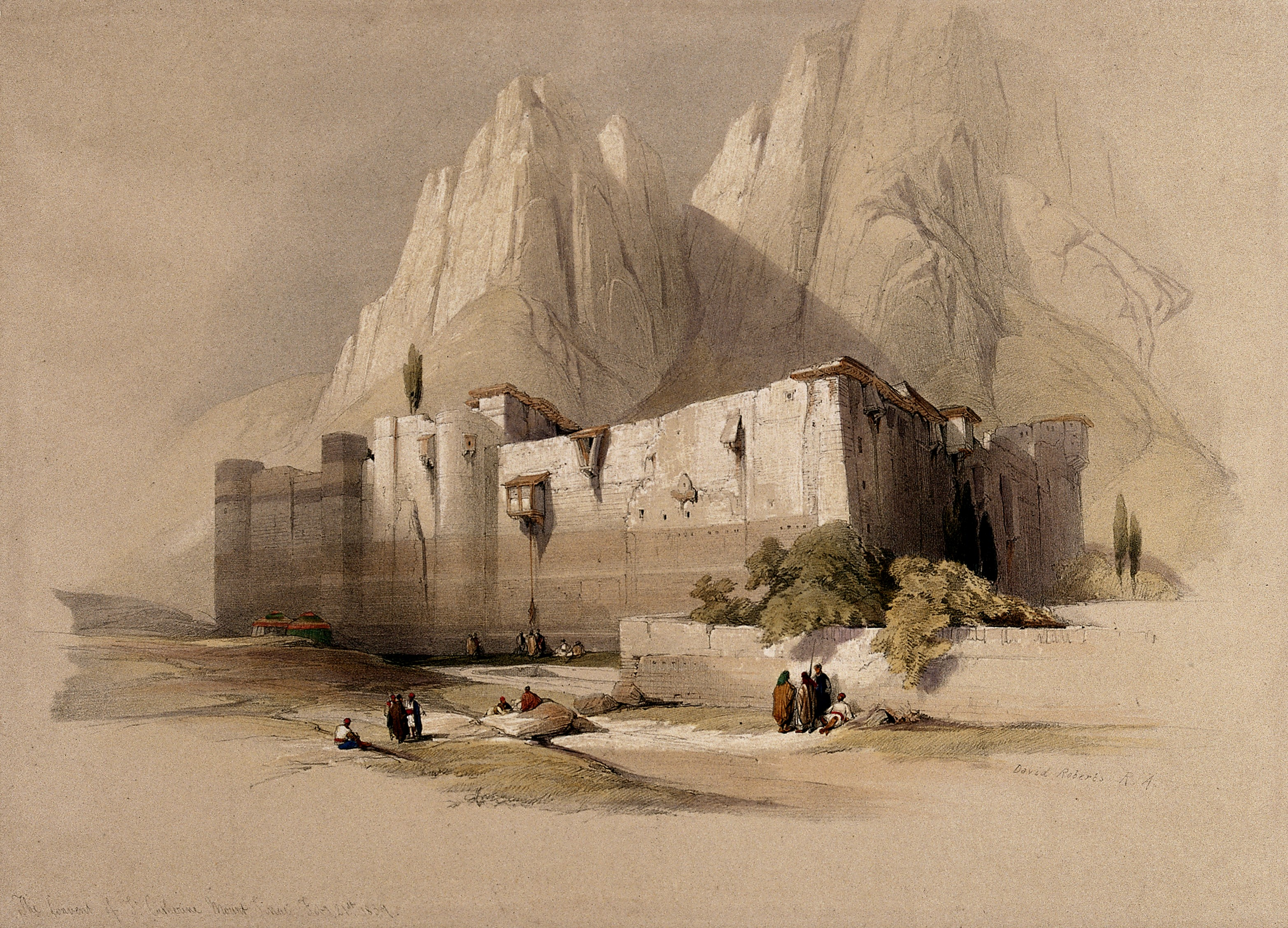
109. Convent of St. Catherine, Mount Sinai.

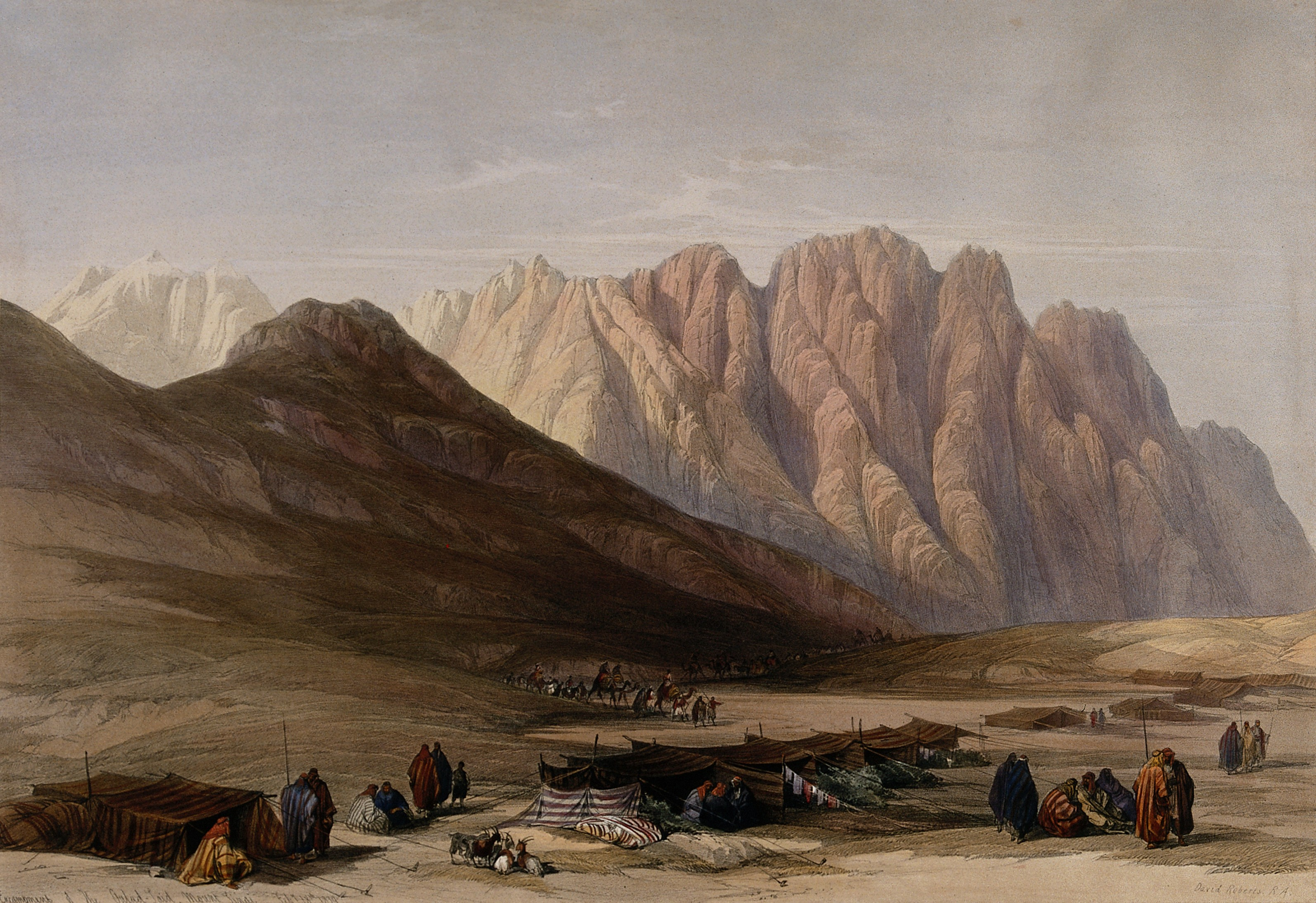
110. Encampment of the Oulad-Said, Mount Sinai.

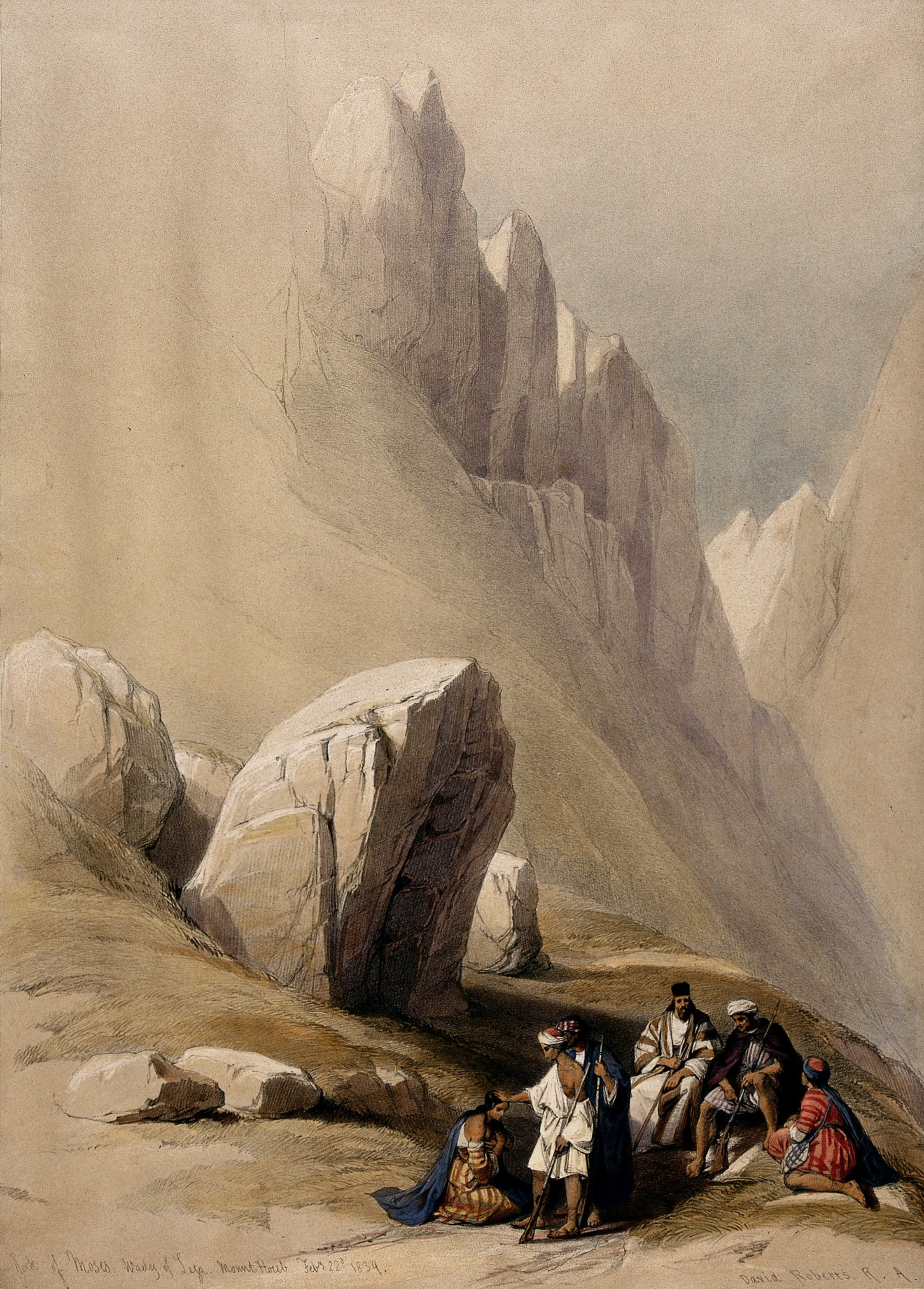
111. Rock of Moses, Wady el-Leja, Mount Horeb.

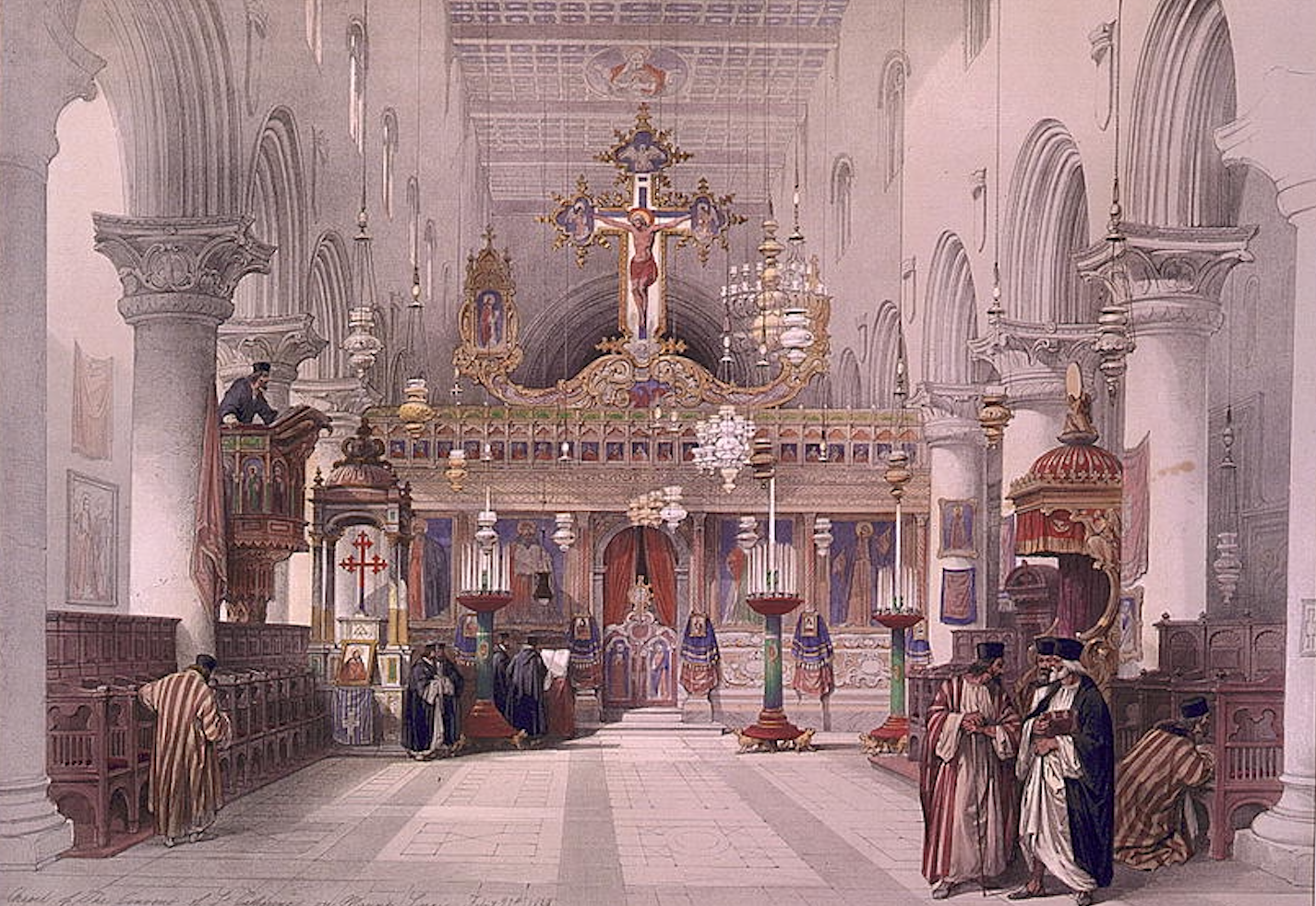
112. Chapel of the Convent of St. Catherine.

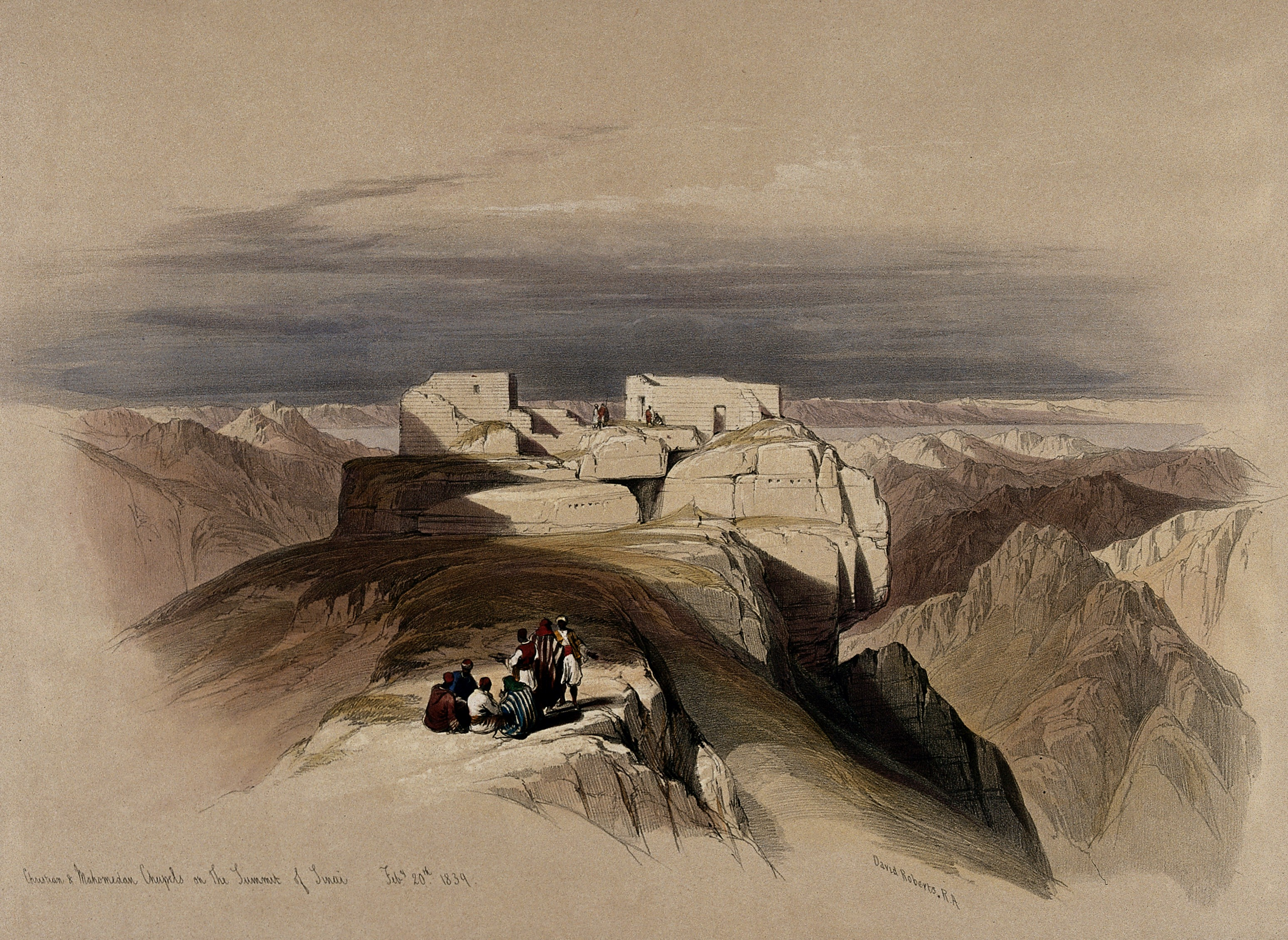
113. The Christian and Mahometan Chapels on Mount Sinai.

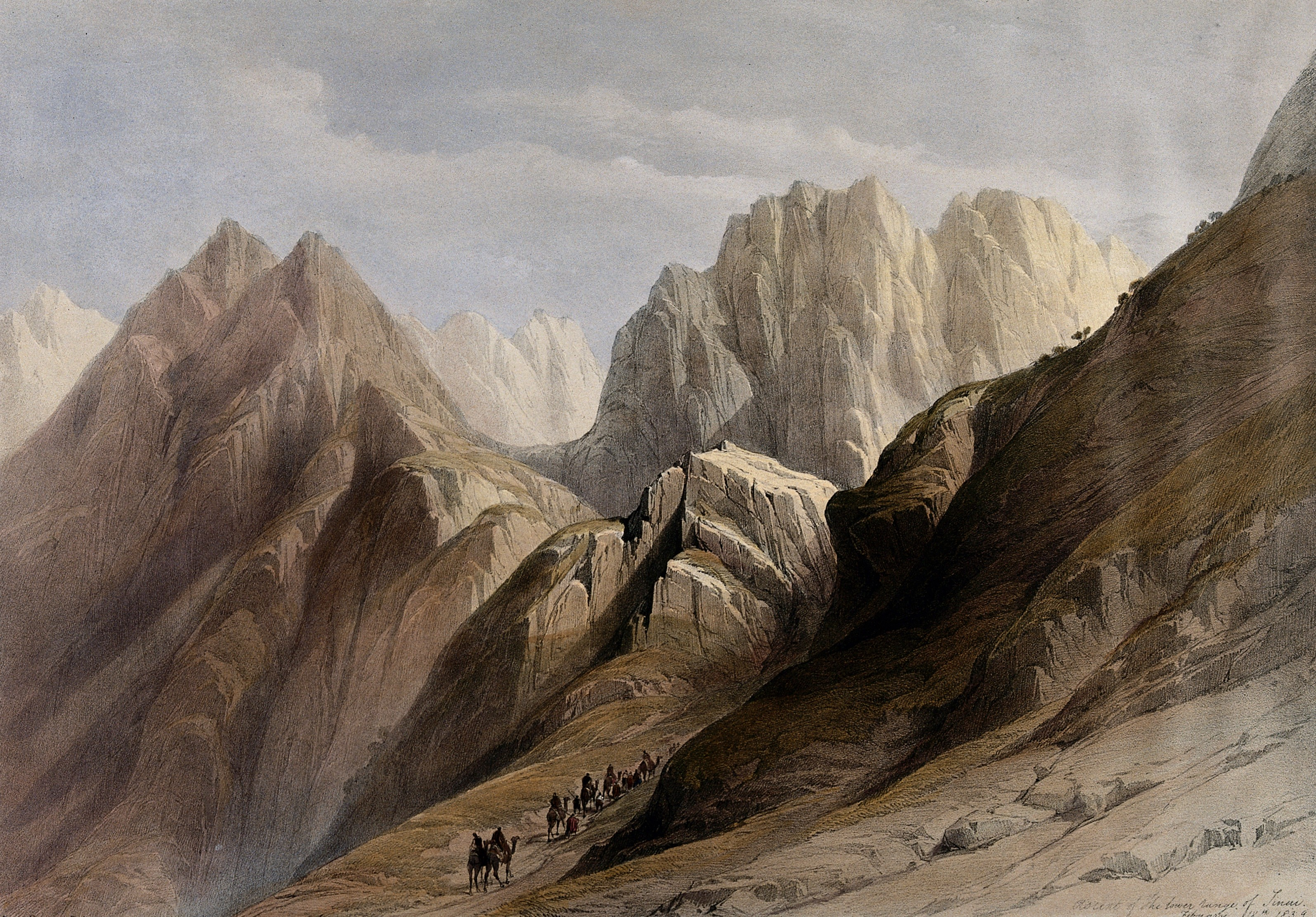
114. Ascent of the Lower Range of Sinai.

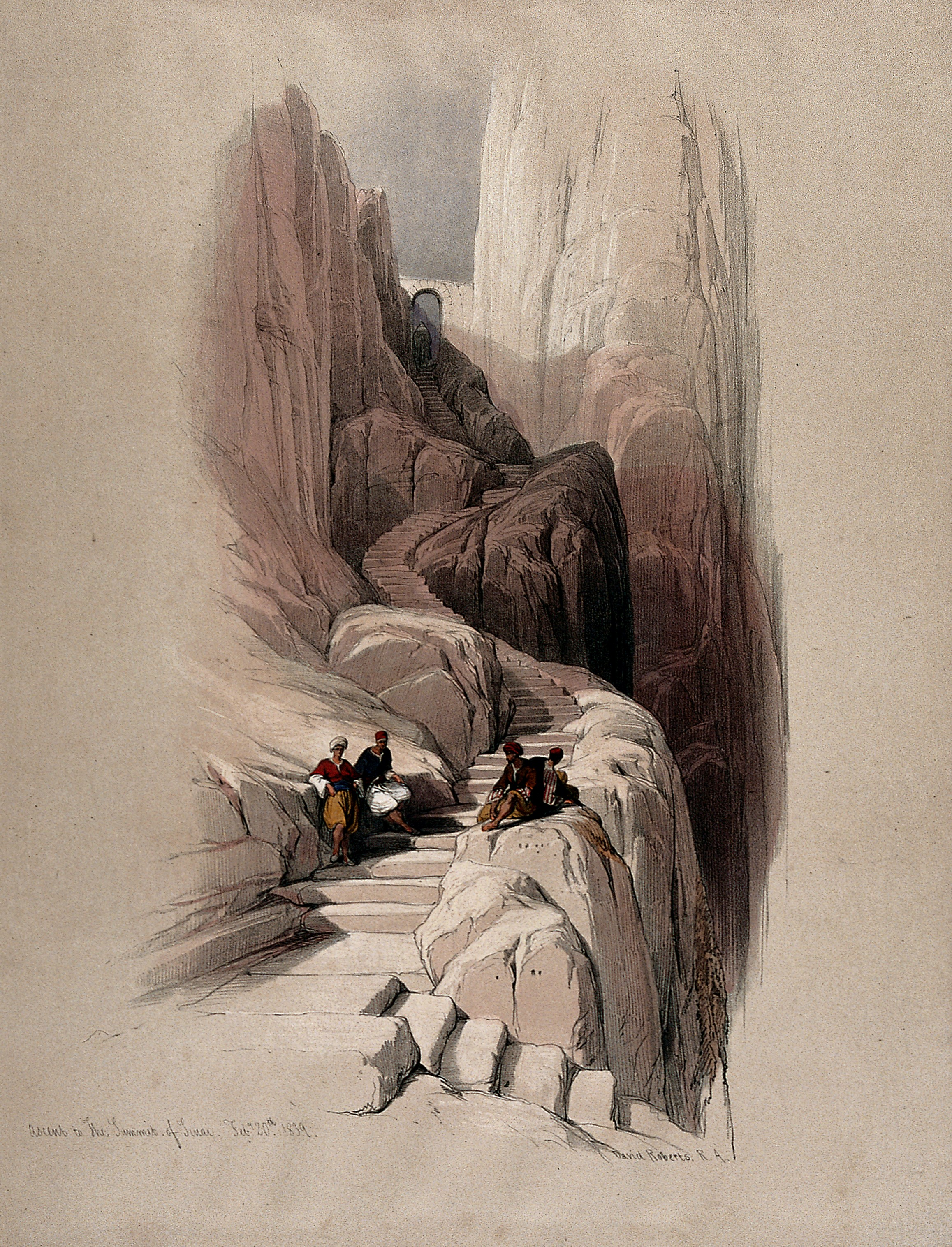
115. Ascent to the summit of Mount Sinai.

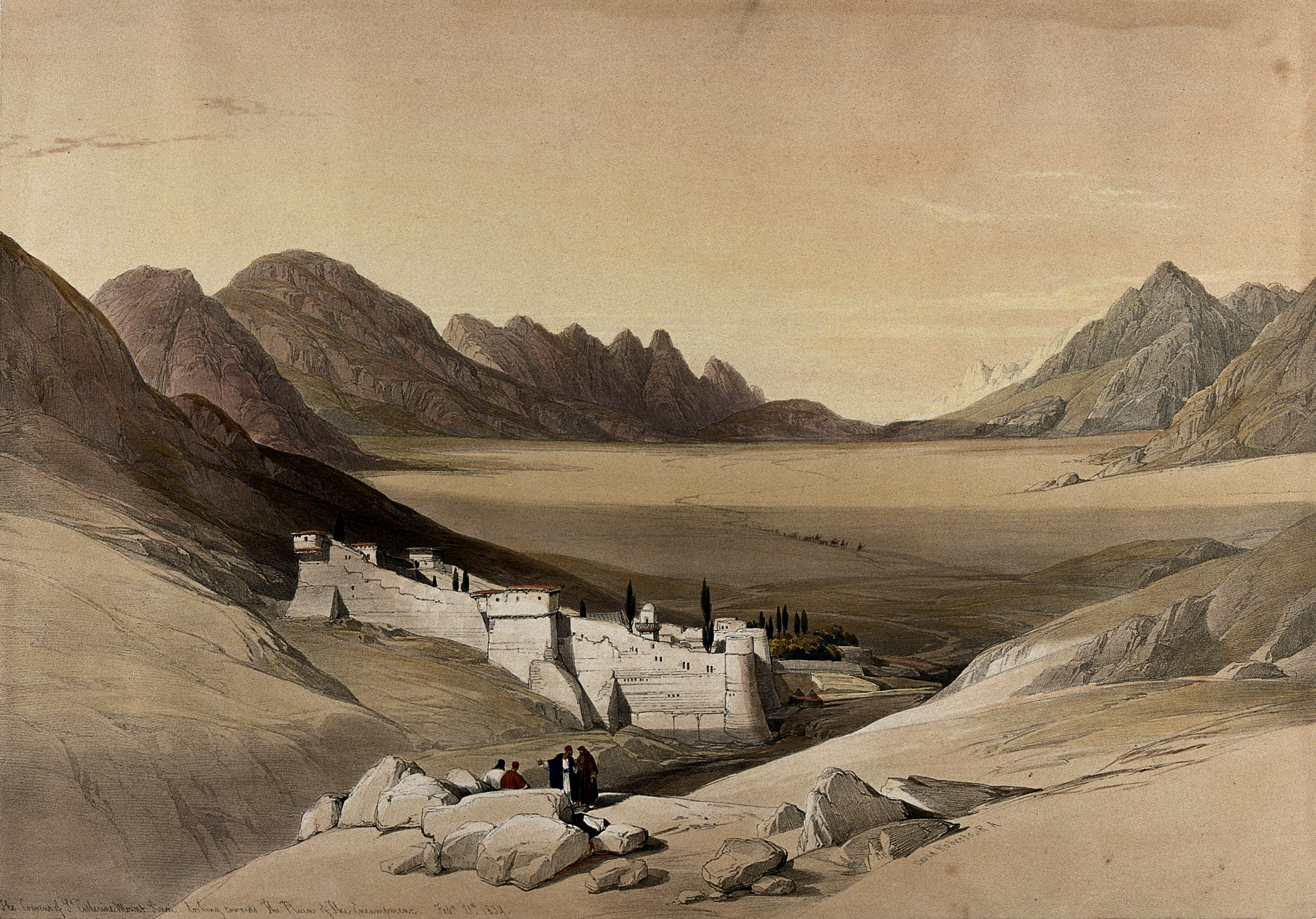
116. The Convent of St. Catherine, Mount Sinai.

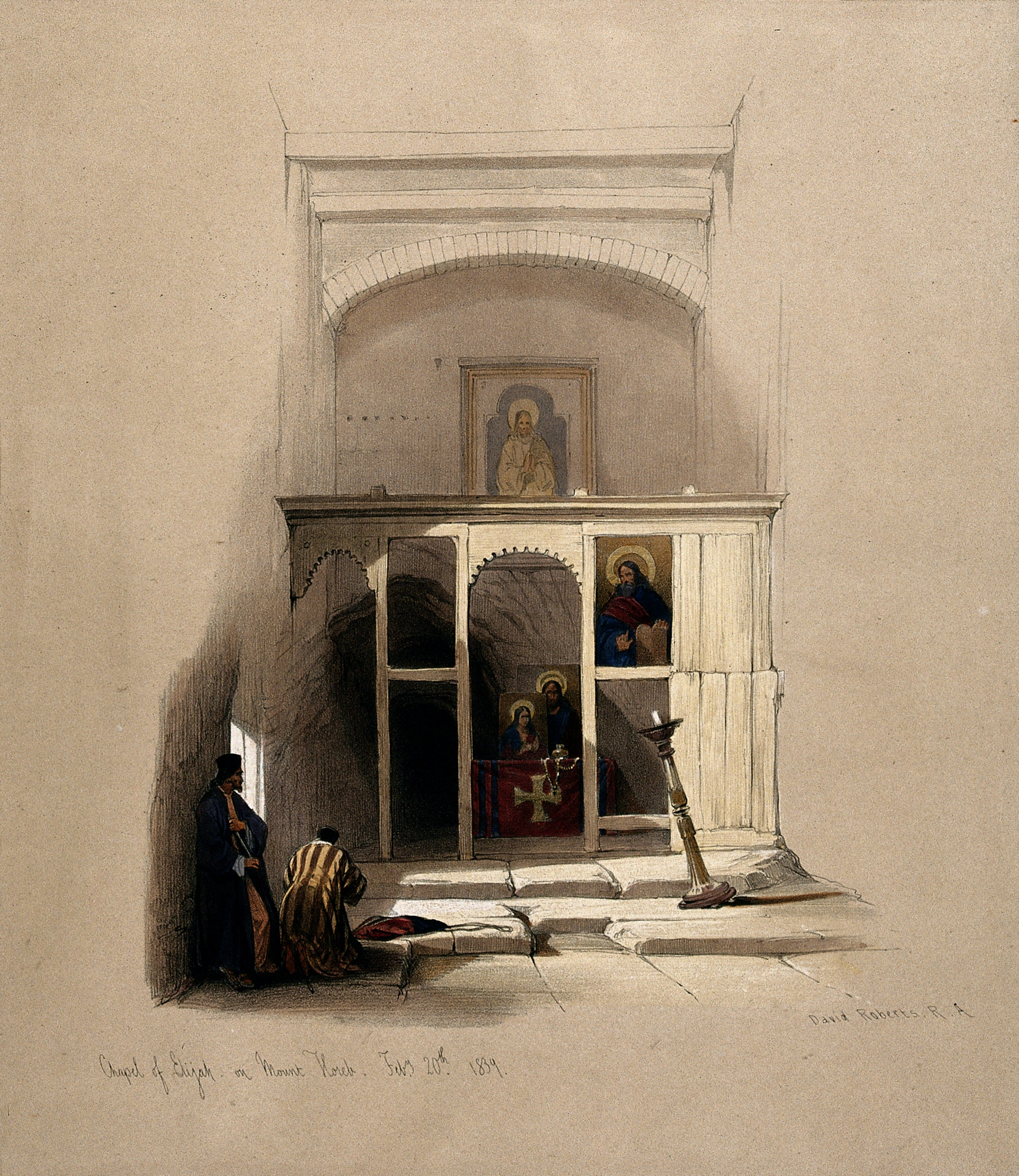
117. Chapel of Elijah, Mount Sinai.

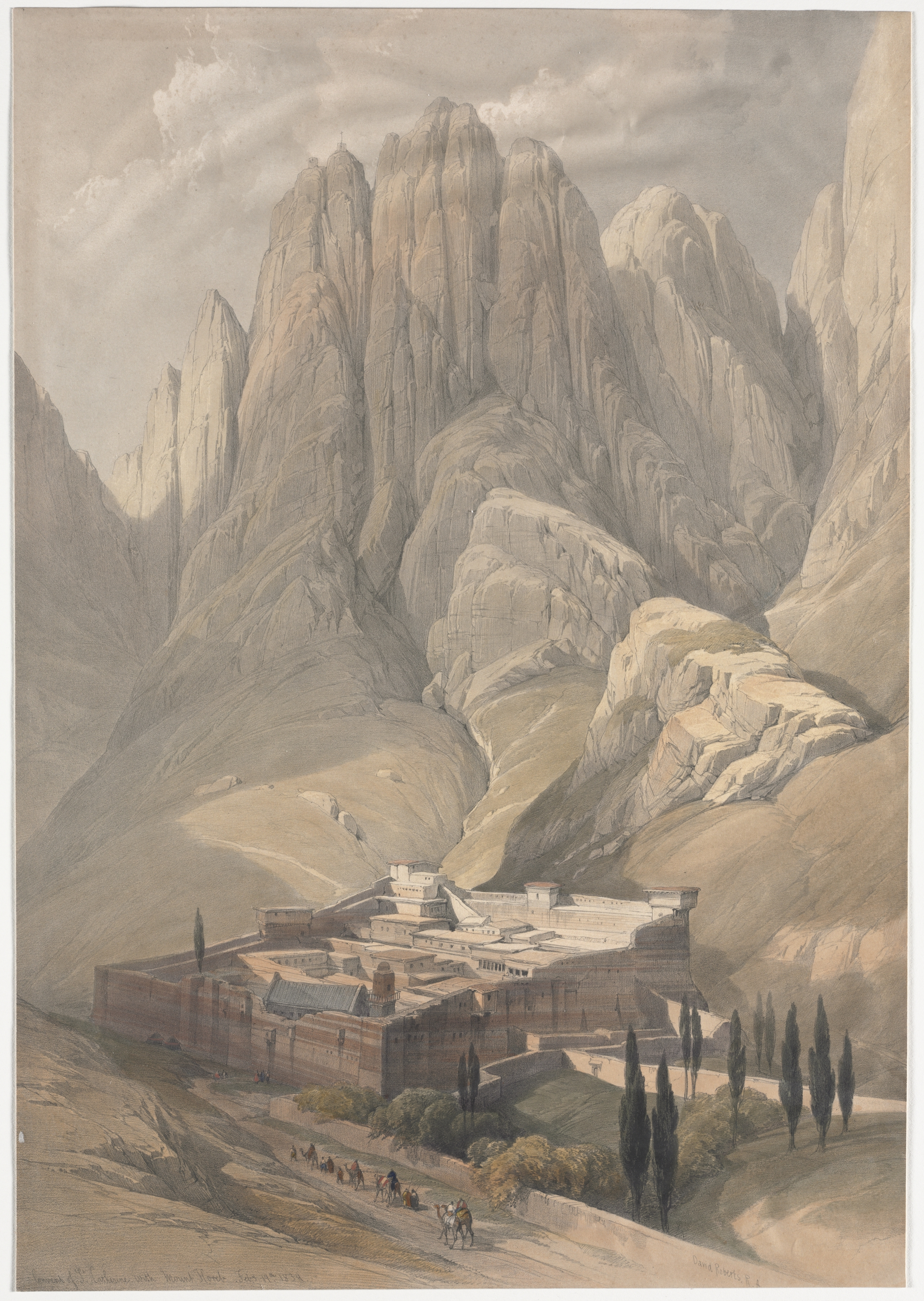
118. Convent of St. Catherine, with Mount Horeb.

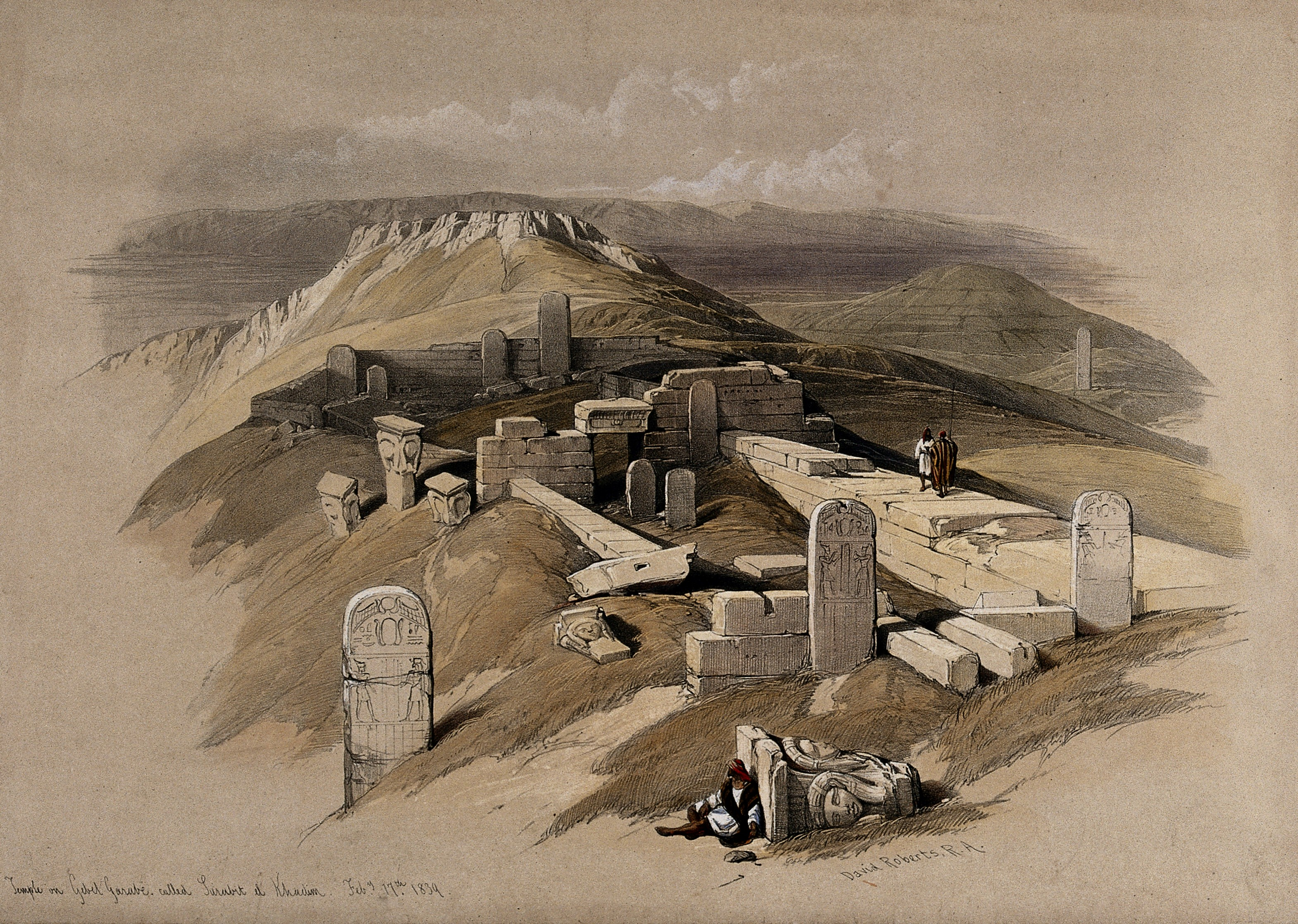
119. Ancient Egyptian Temple on Gebel Garabe, known as Serabit el-Khadim

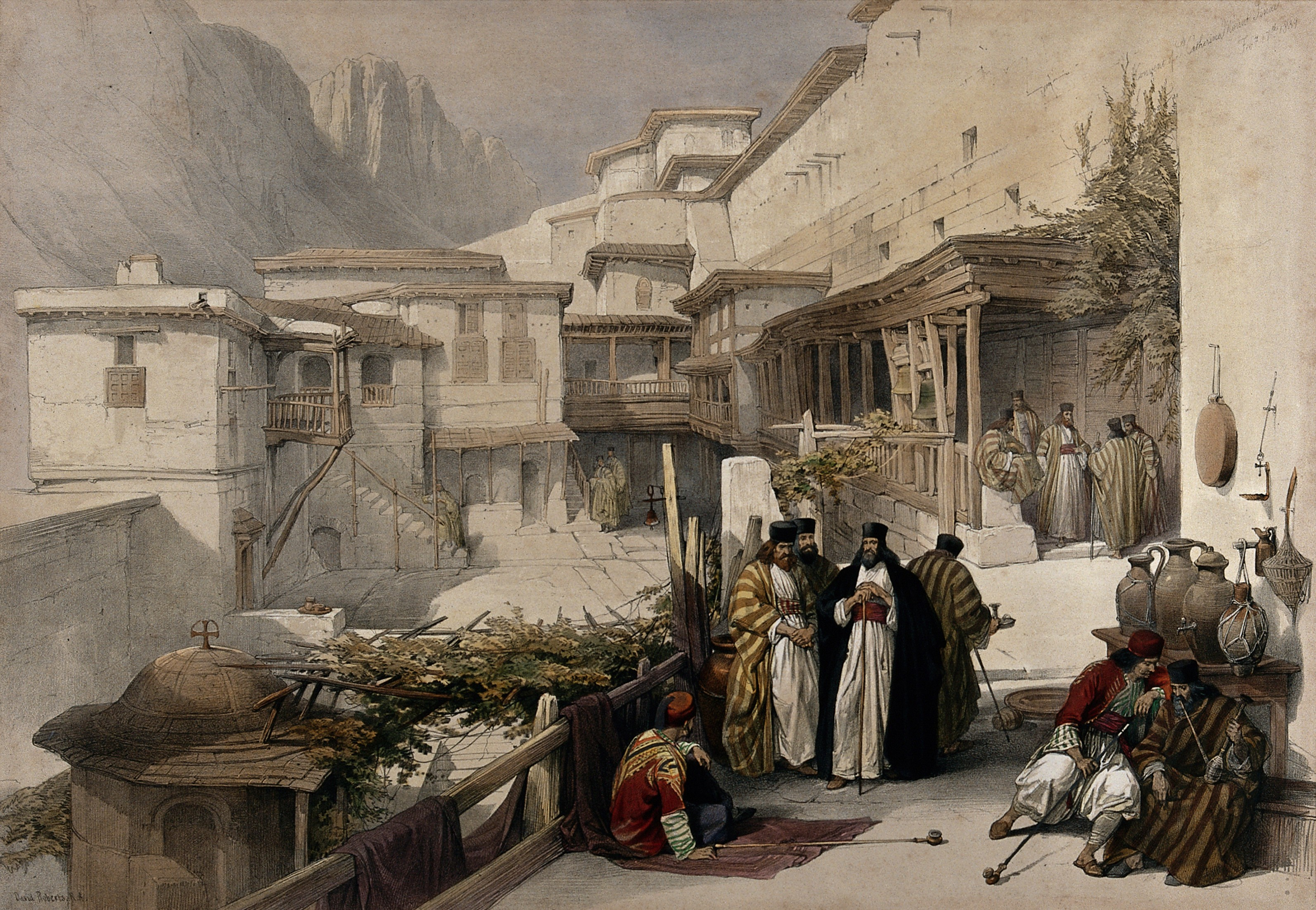
120. Principal Court of the Convent of St. Catherine.

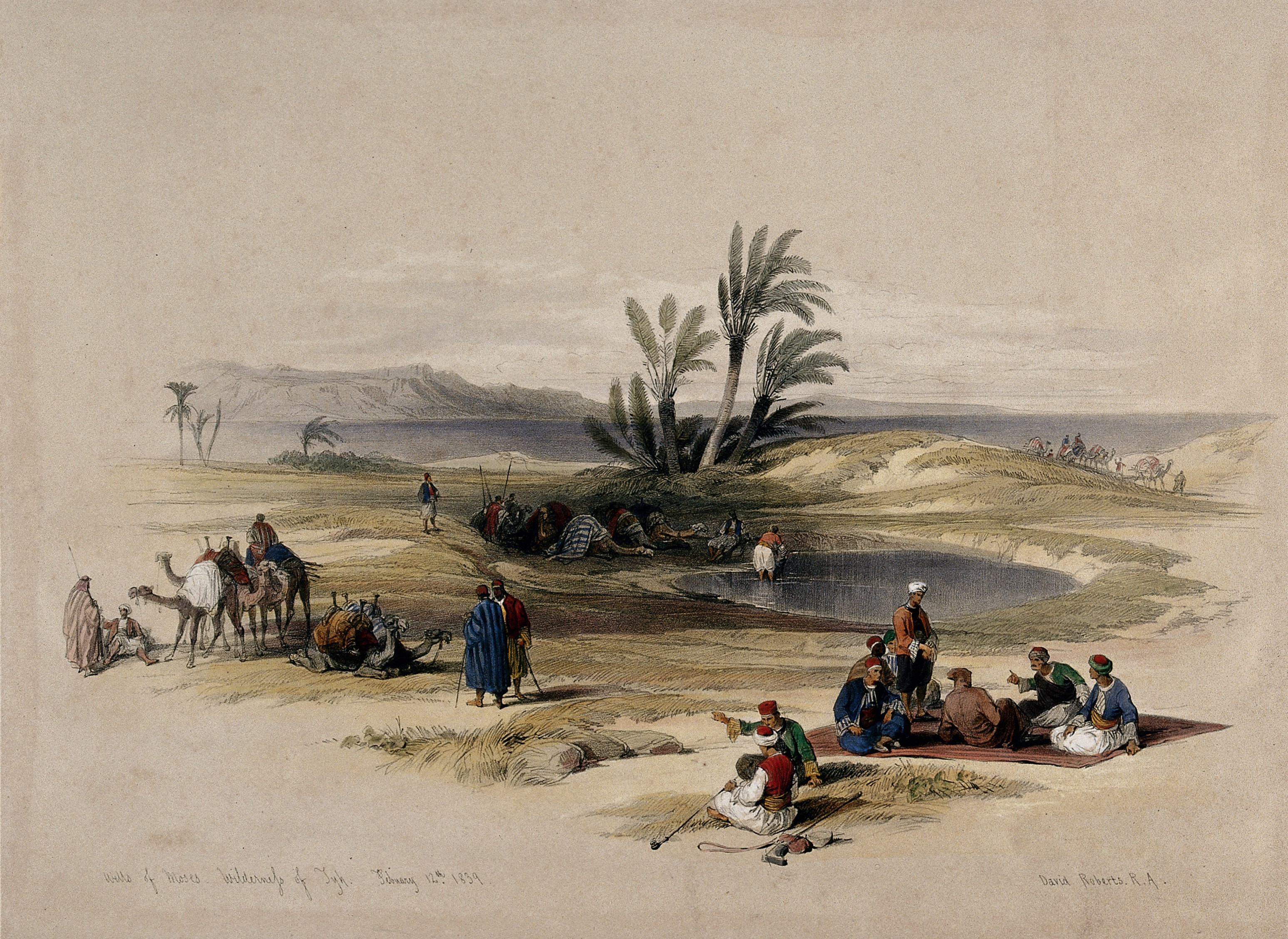
121. Ayun Musa - The Wells of Moses, Wilderness of Tyh.

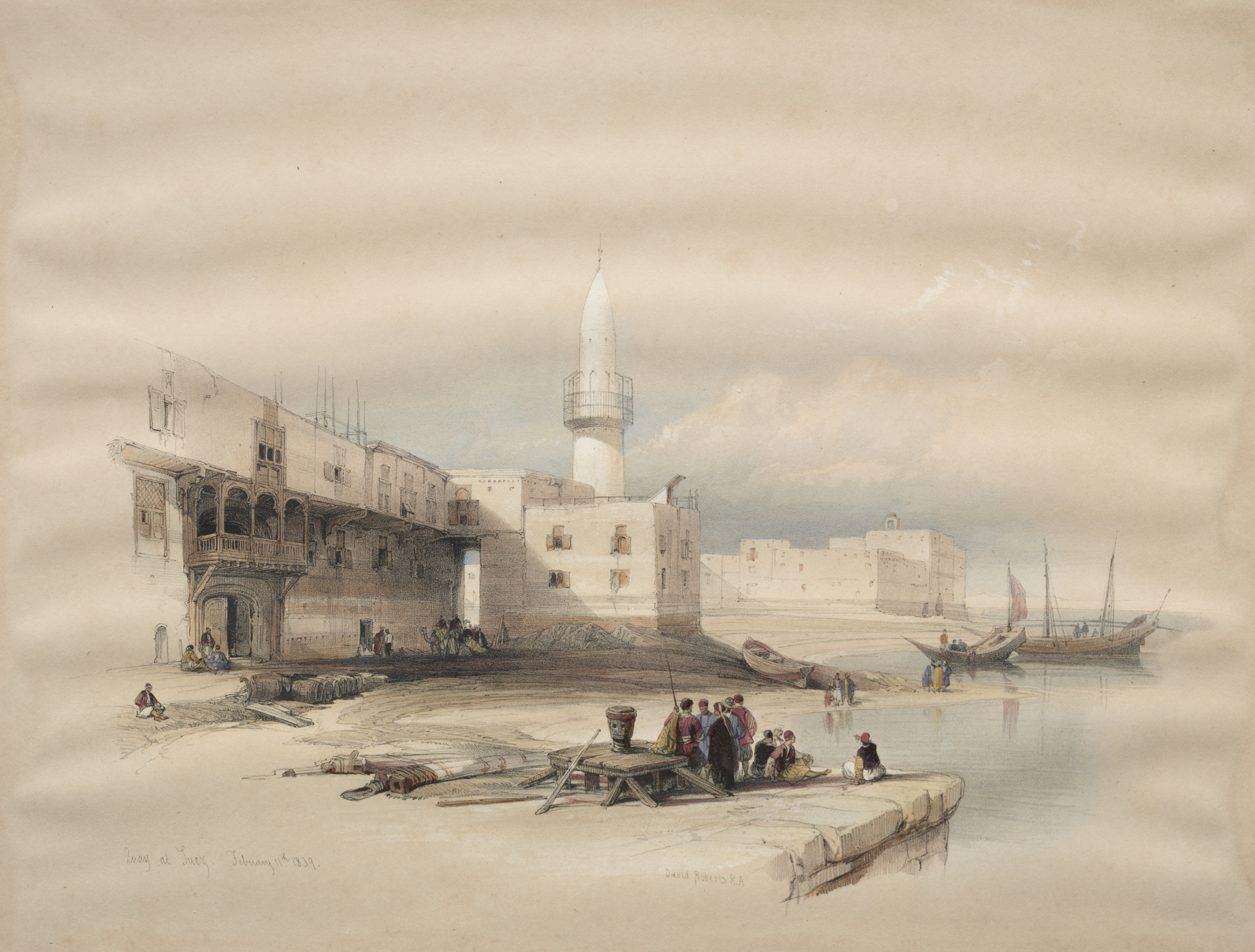
123. Scene on the Quay of Suez.

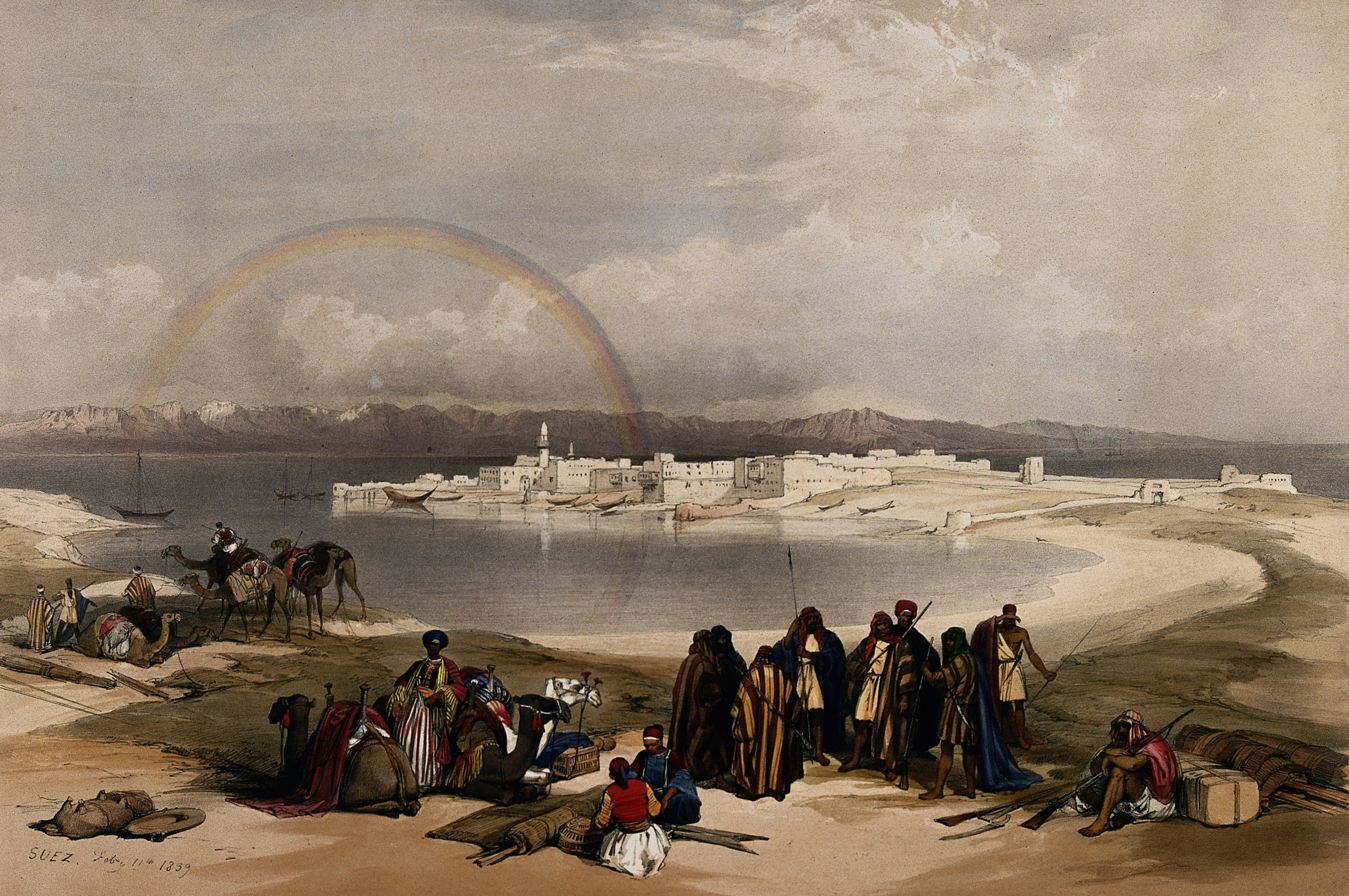
124. Suez. General view.

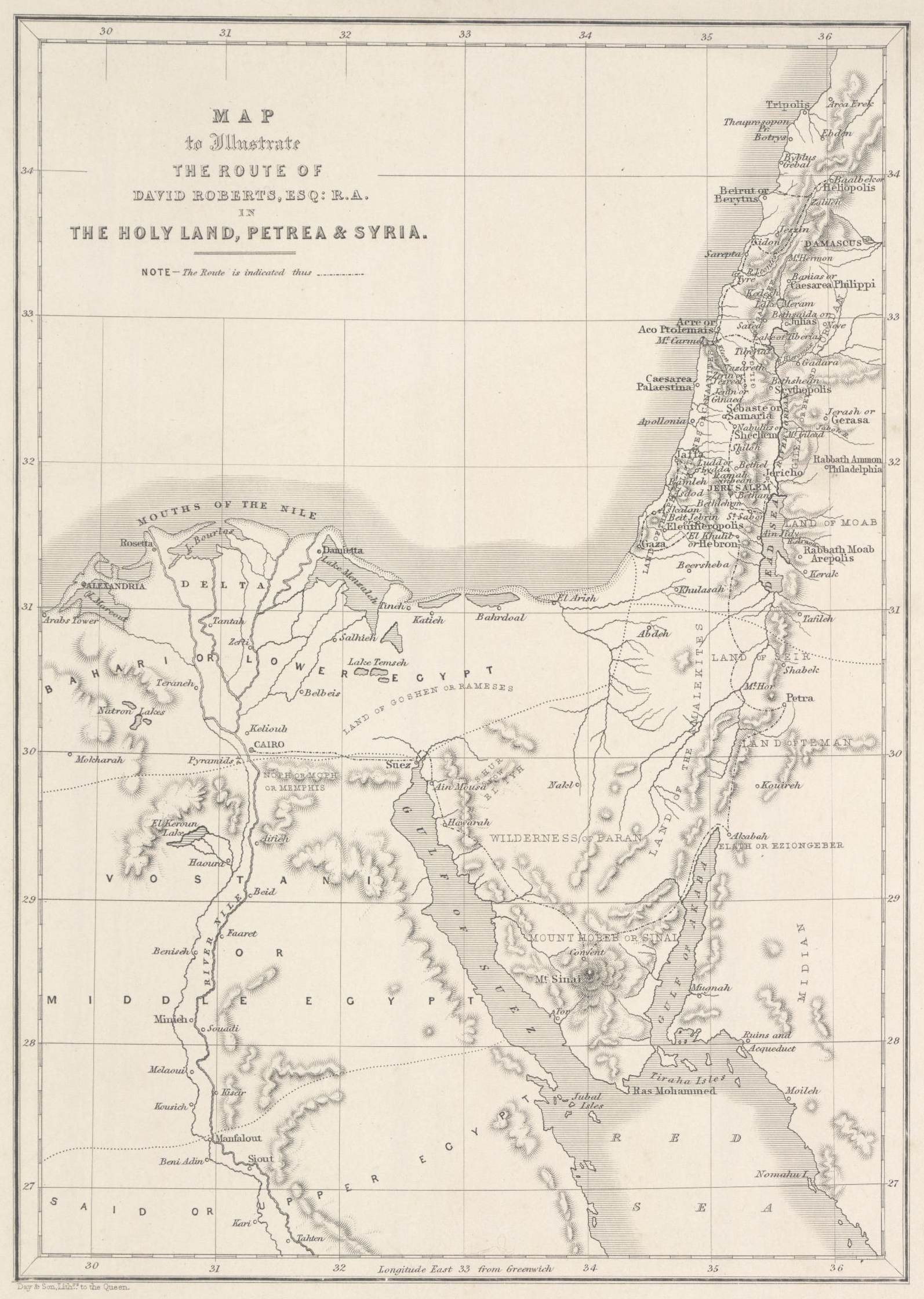
125. [Map] The Route of David Roberts in The Holy Land, Petrea & Syria.

=== Volume 4 ===
126. Frontispiece. View under the Grand Portico, Philoe. 127. Tile page. Entrance to the Great Temple of Aboo-Simbel, Nubia.

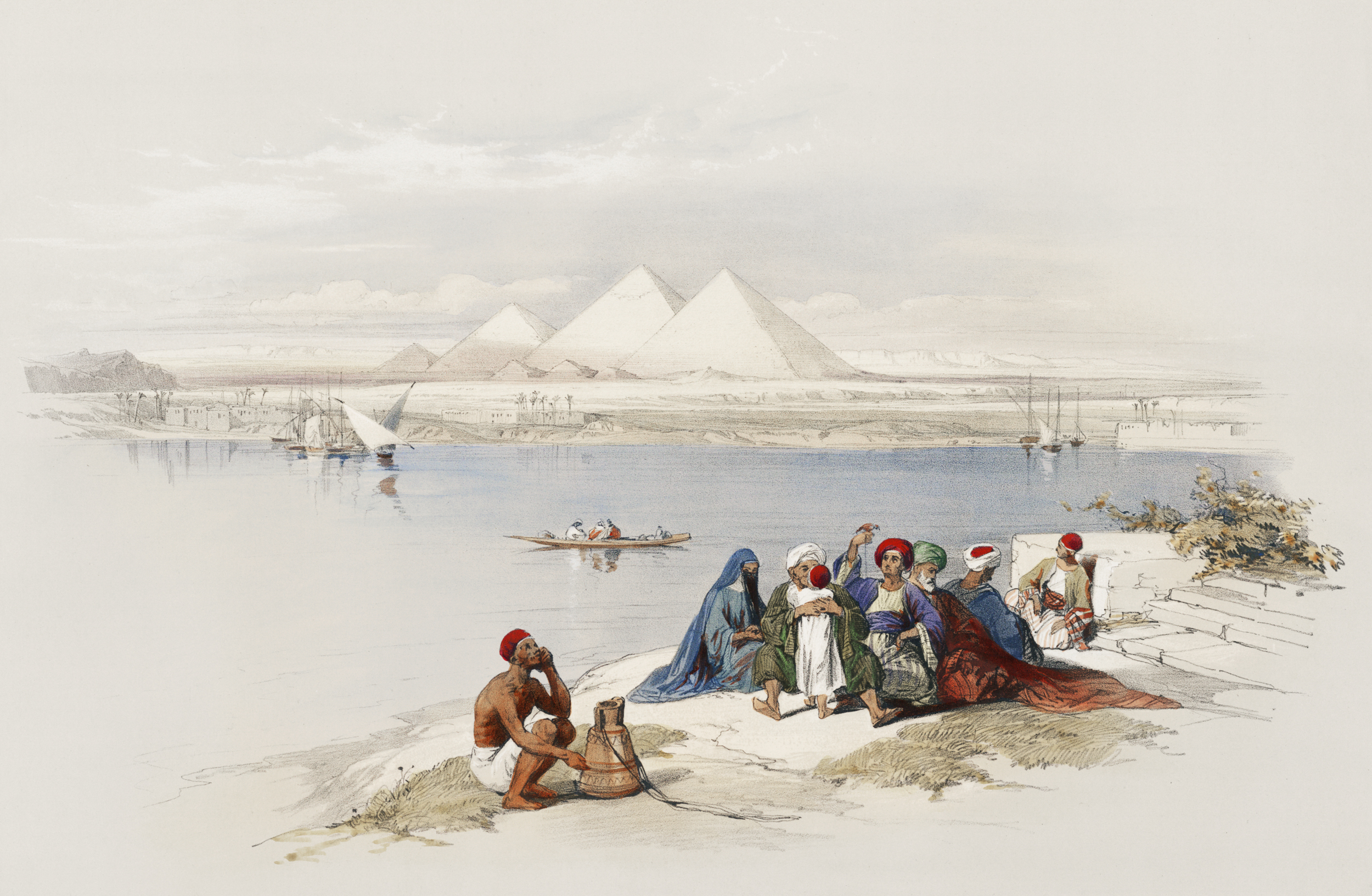
128. Pyramids of Gizeh, from the Nile.

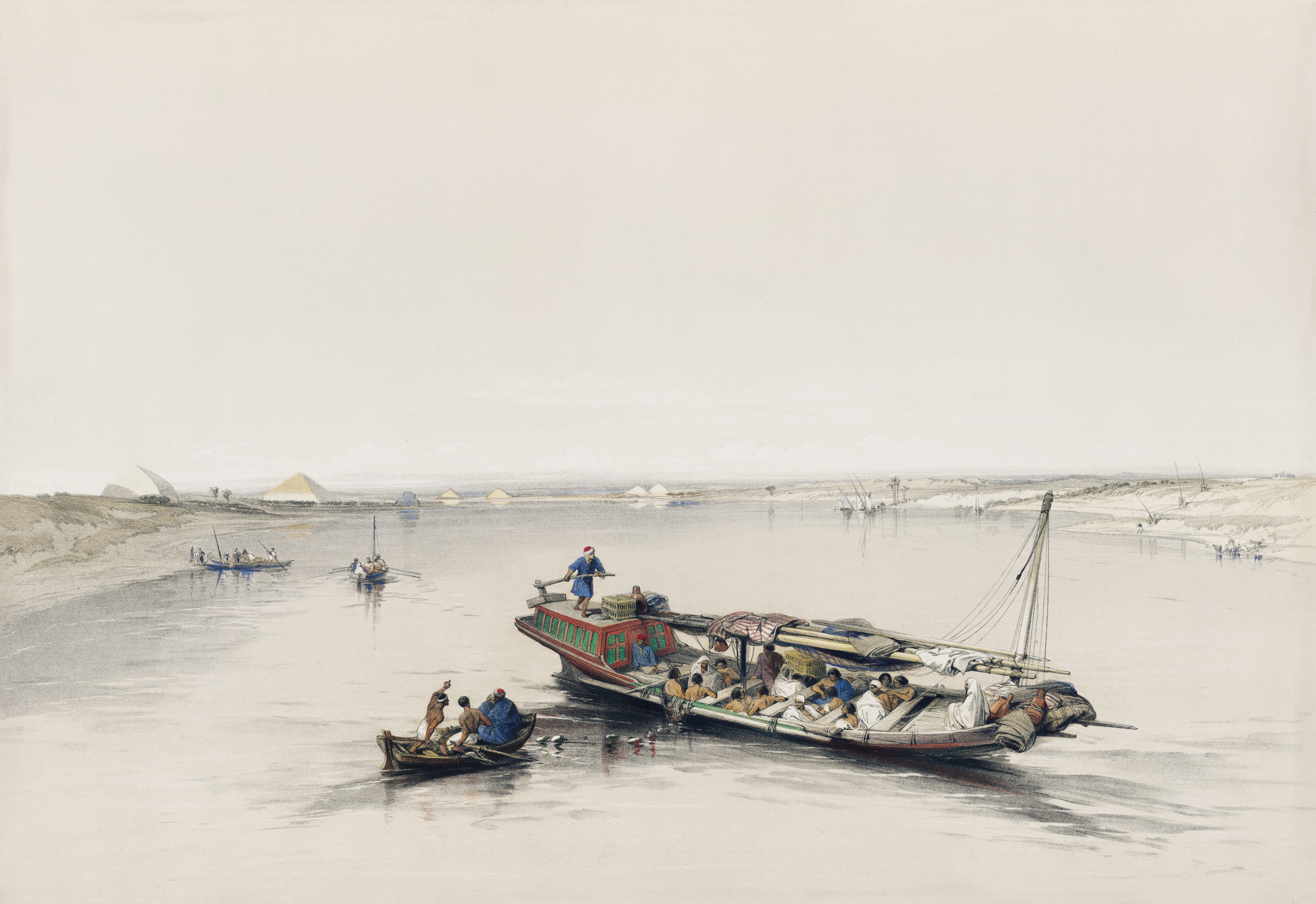
129. View looking towards the Pyramids of Dashour and Sacara - Slave boat on the Nile.

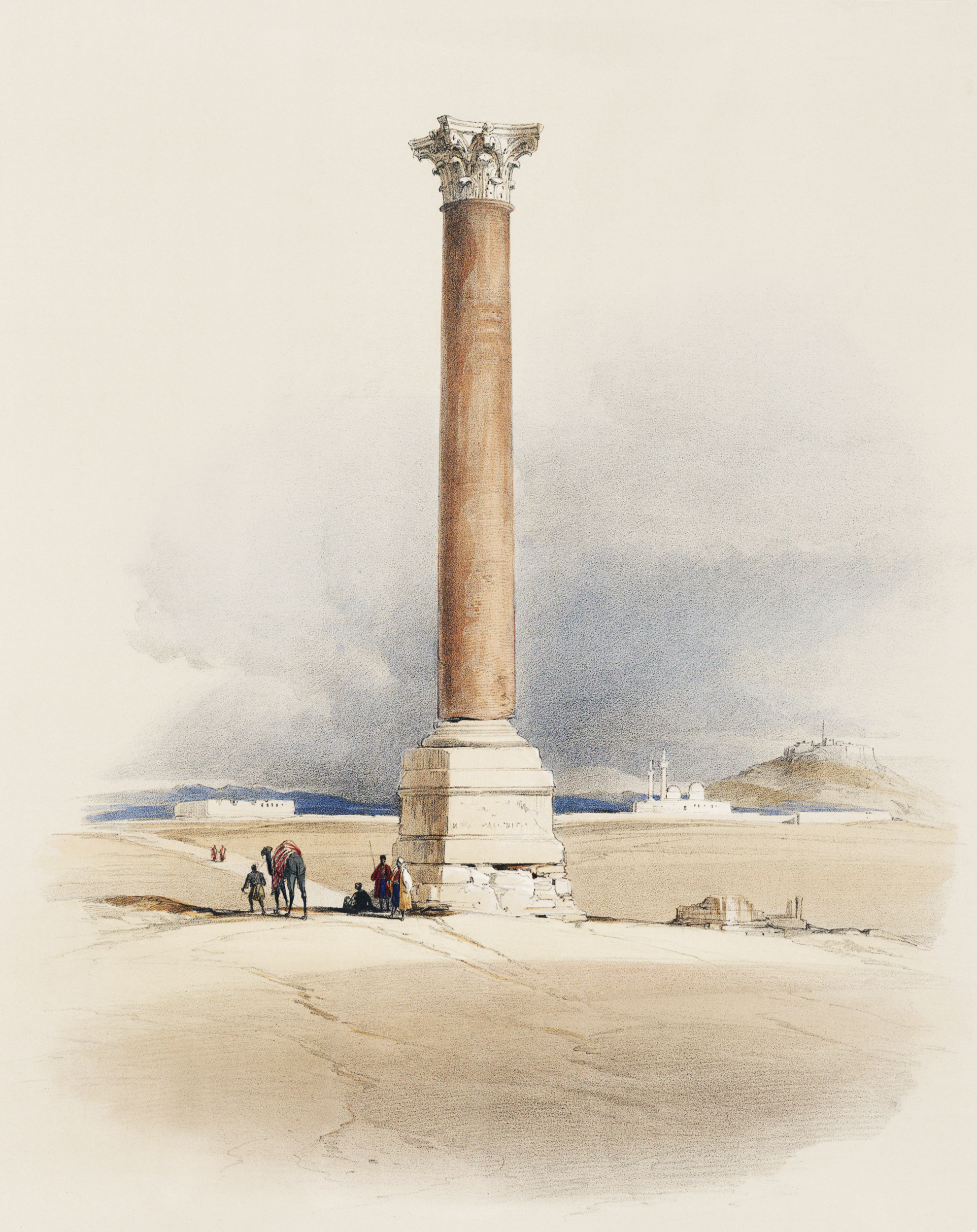
130. Pompey's Pillar, Alexandria.

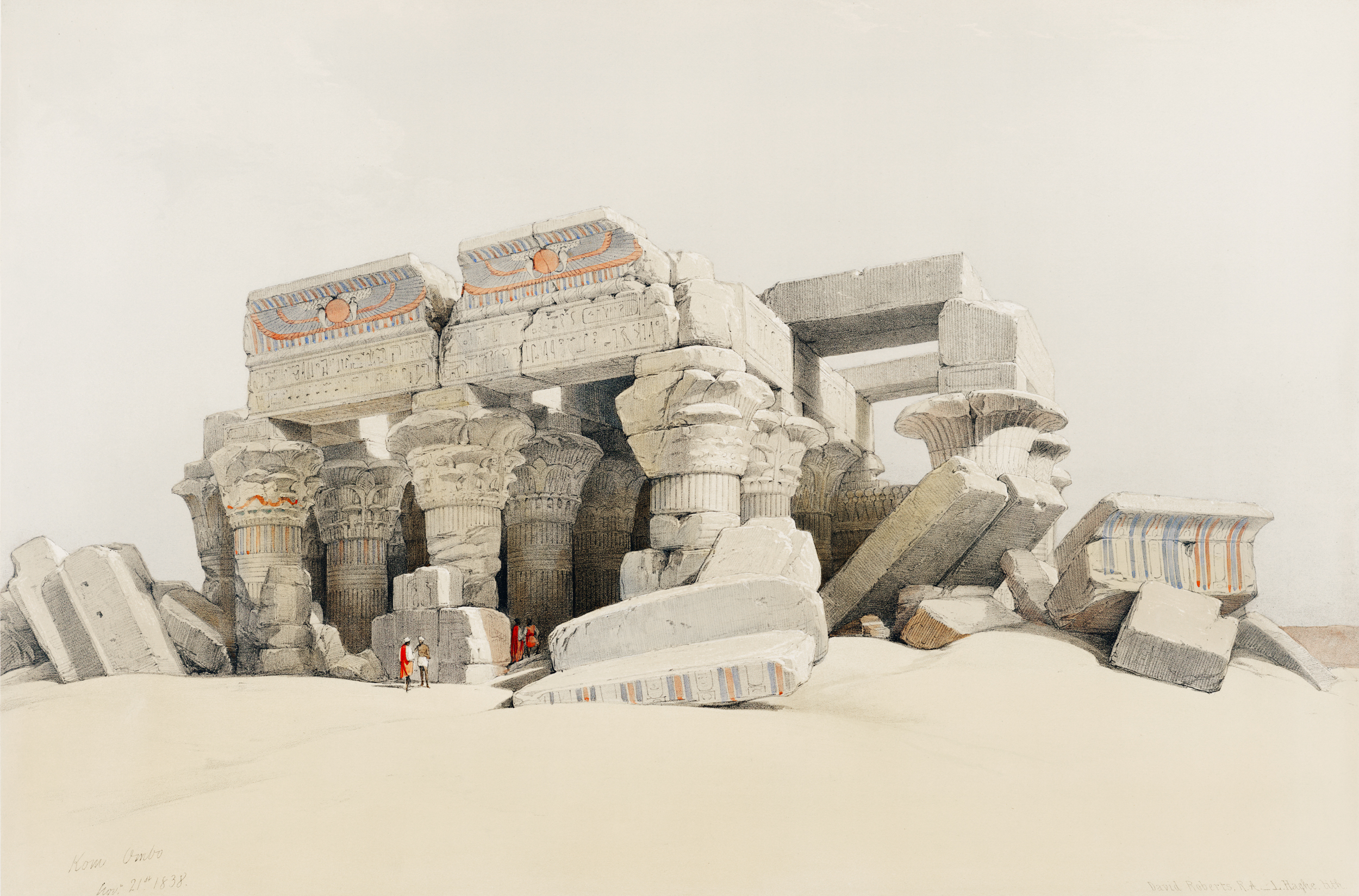
131. Ruins of the Temple of Kom-Ombo, Upper Egypt.

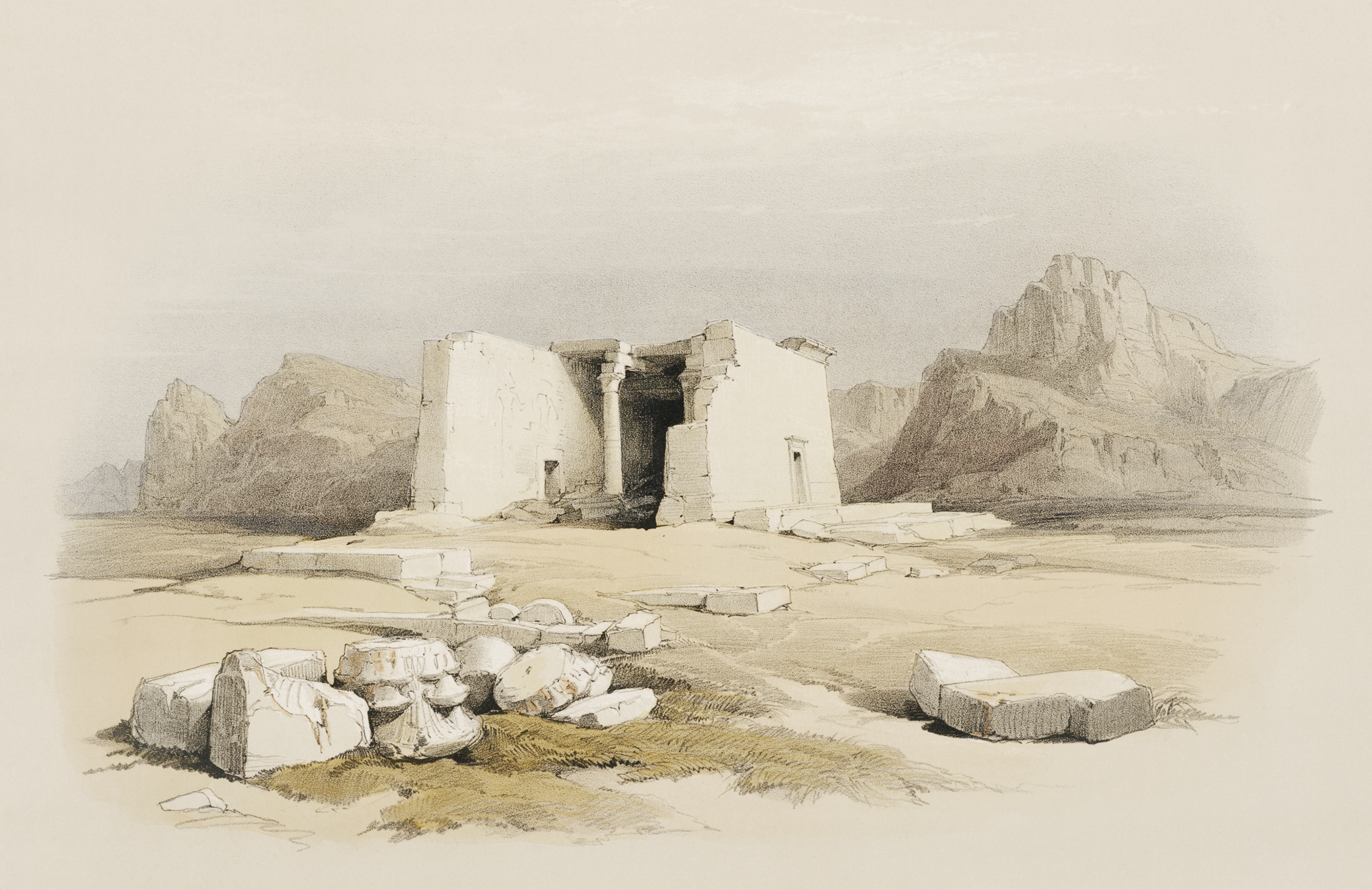
132. Temple of Tafa, in Nubia.

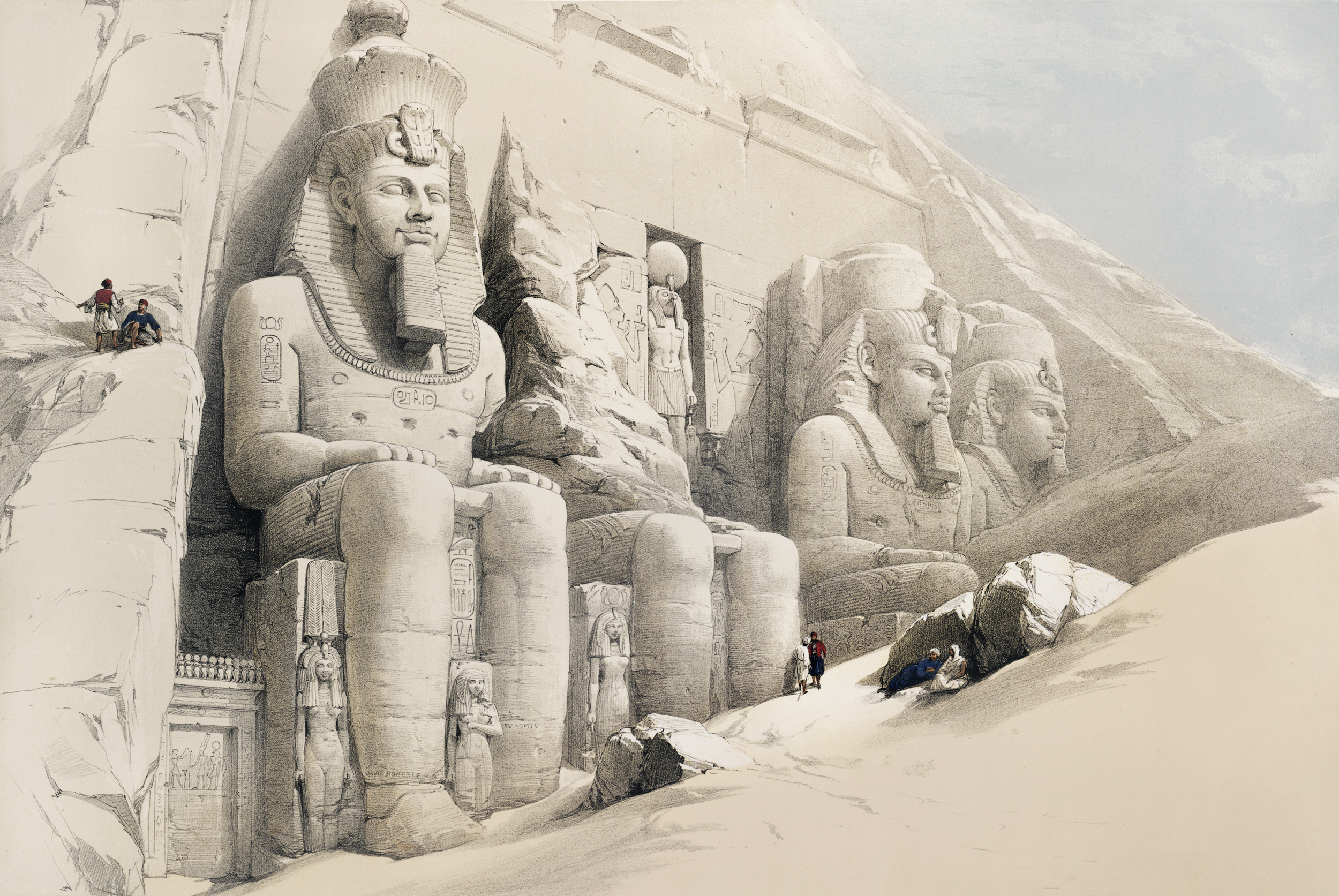
133. Colossal figures in front of the Great Temple of Aboo-Simbel.

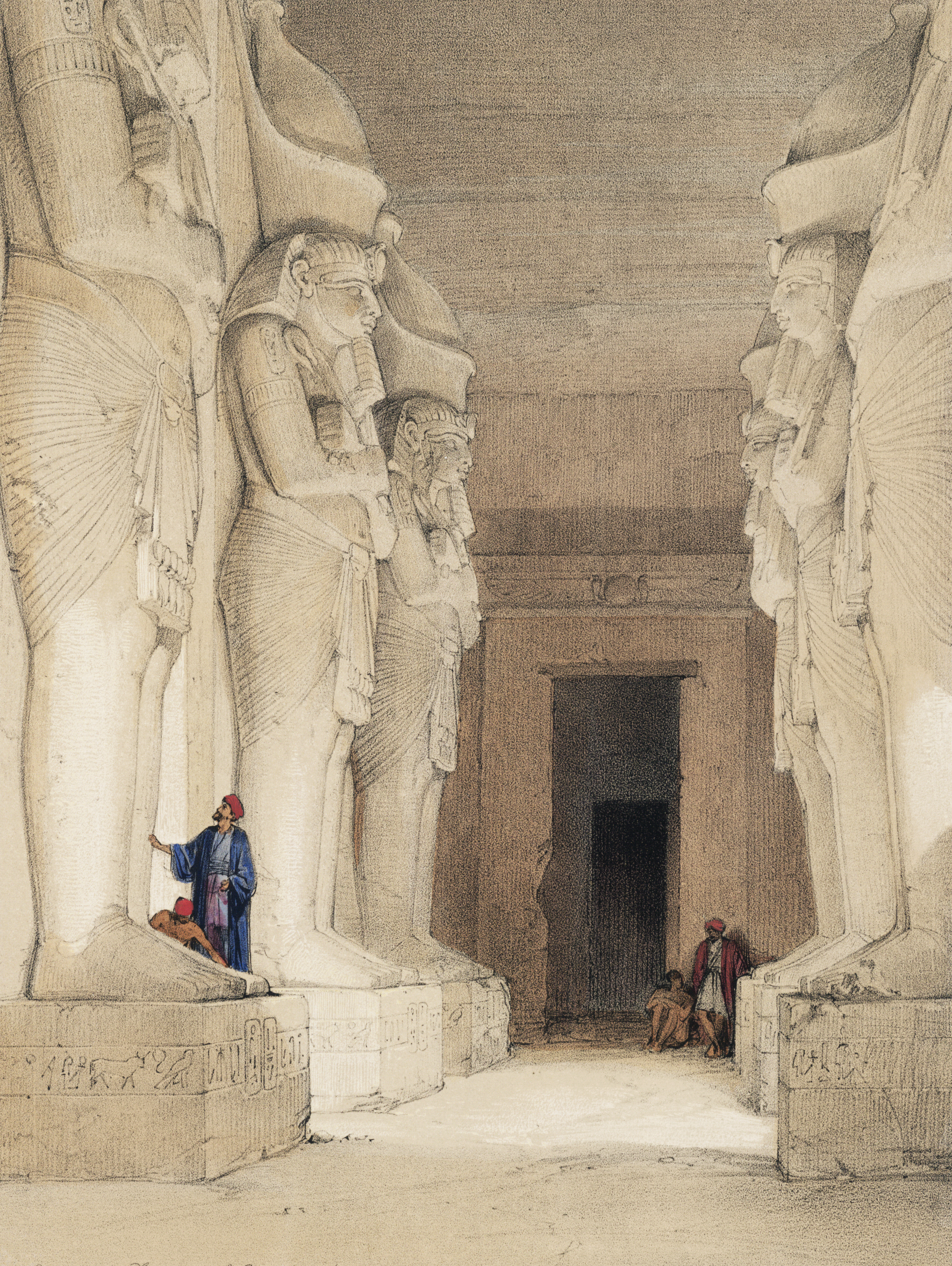
134. Excavated Temple of Gyrshe, Nubia.

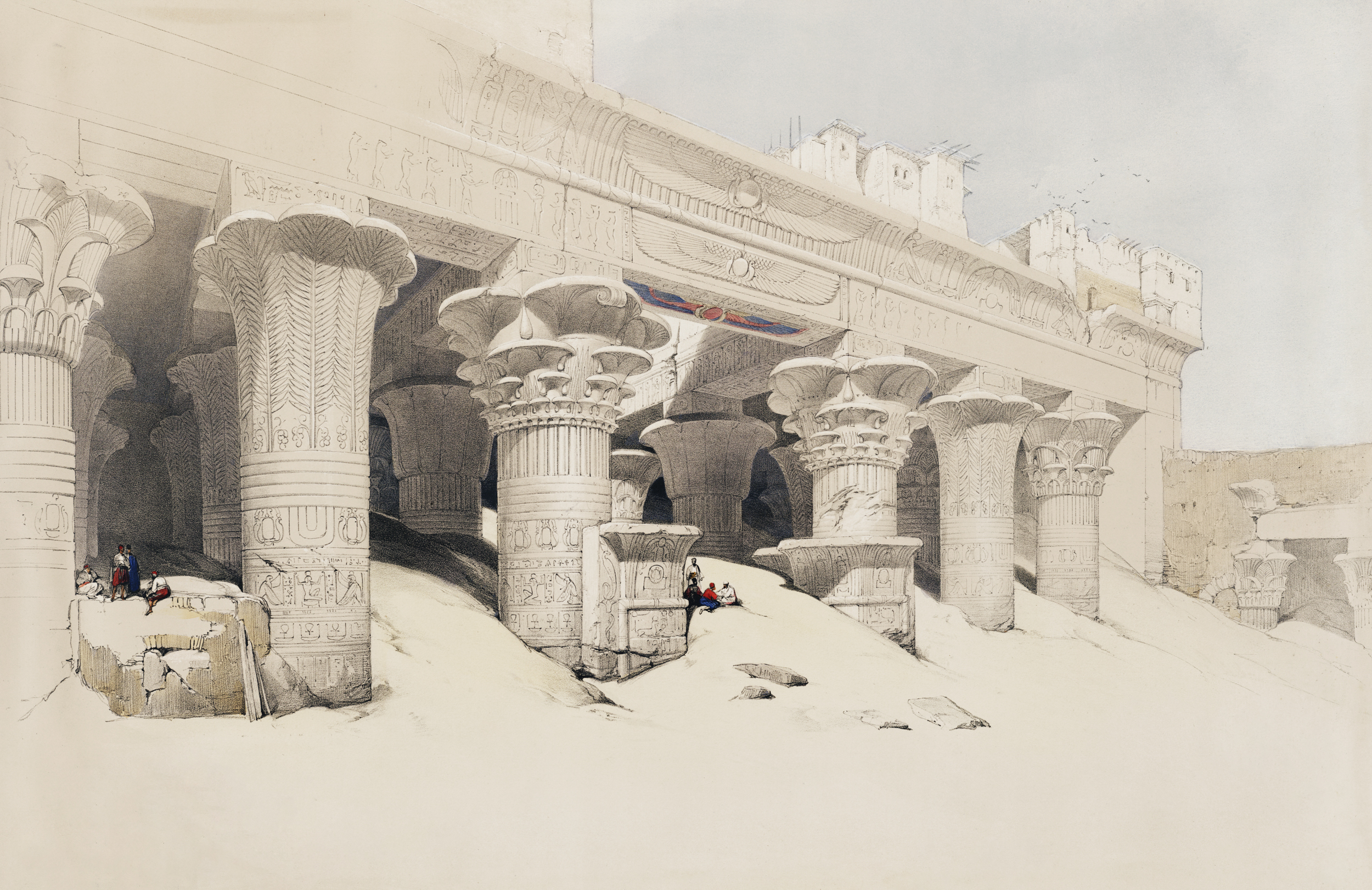
135. Portico of the Temple of Edfou, Upper Egypt.

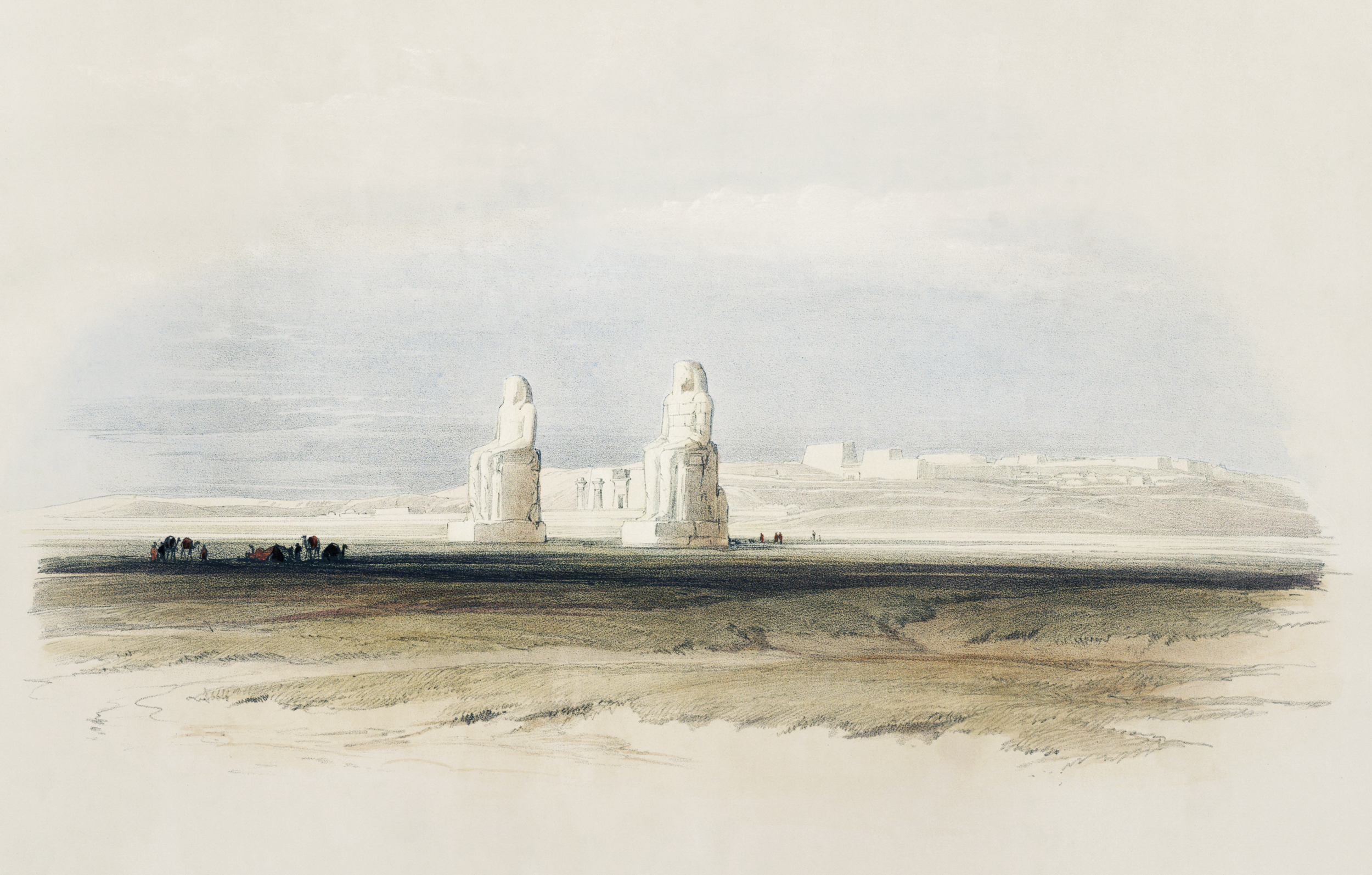
136. Statues of Memnon, on the plain of Goorna, at Thebes.

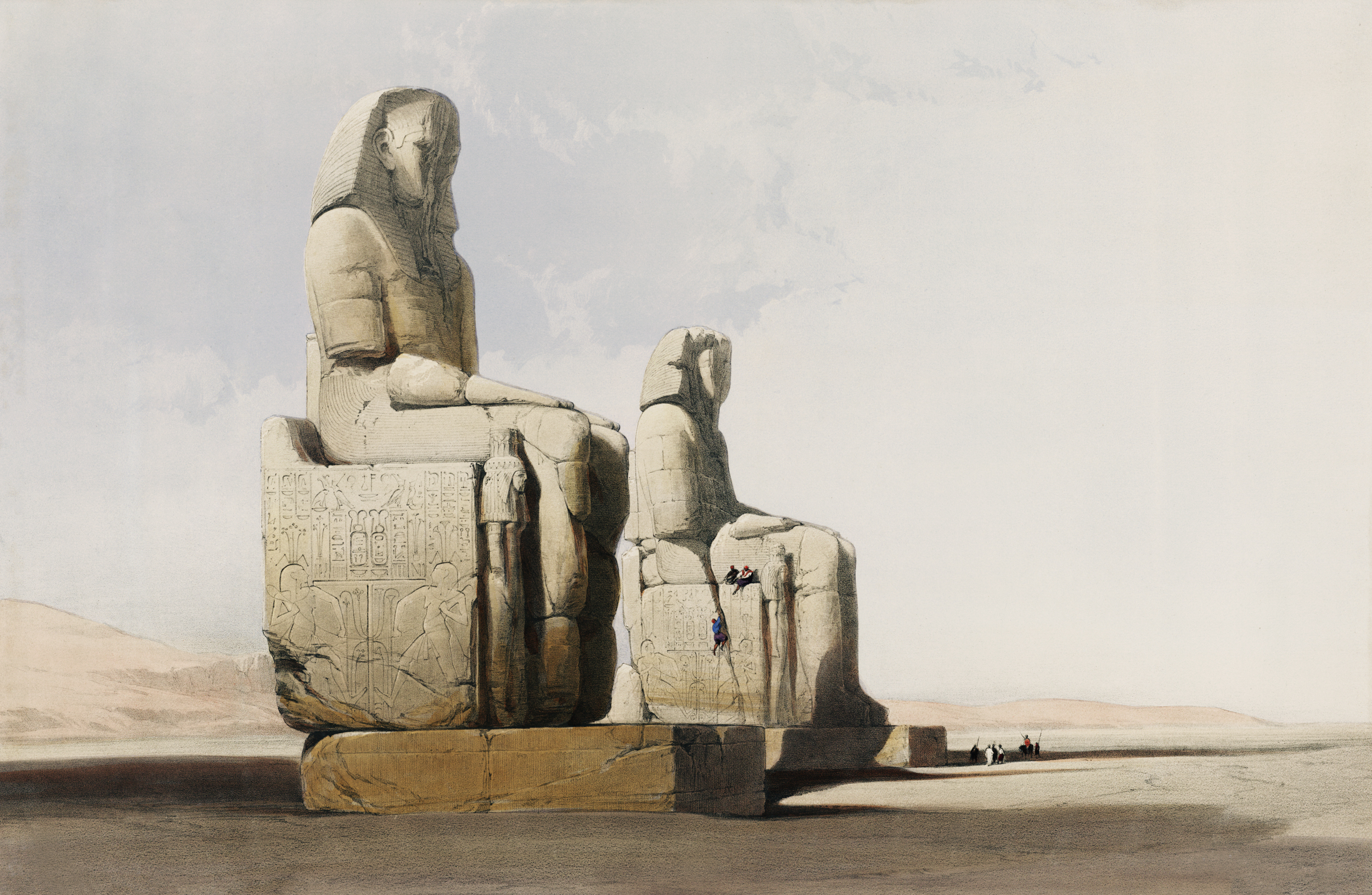
137. Thebes. The colossal statues of Amenoph III.

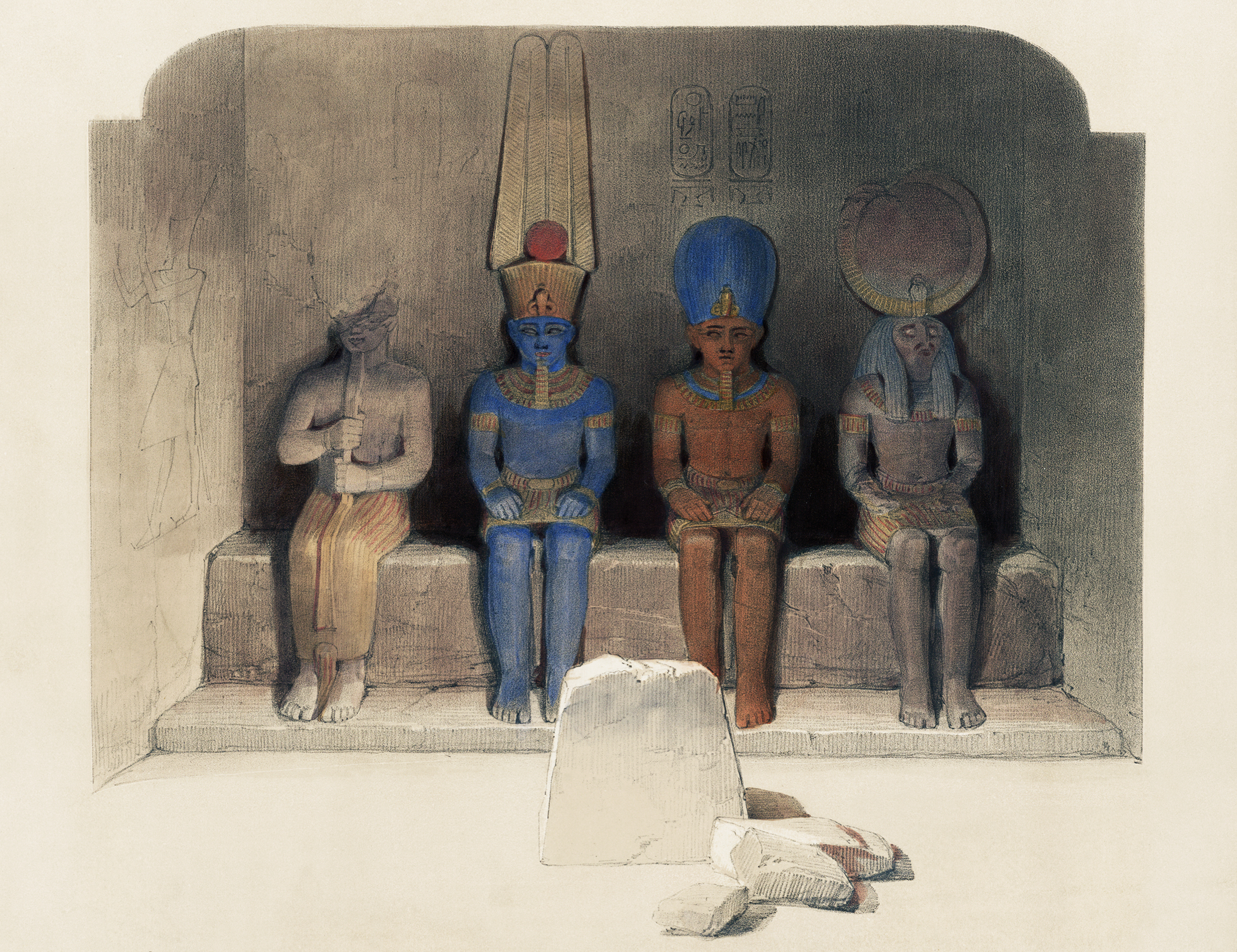
138. The Sanctuary of the Great Temple of Aboo-Simbel, Nubia.

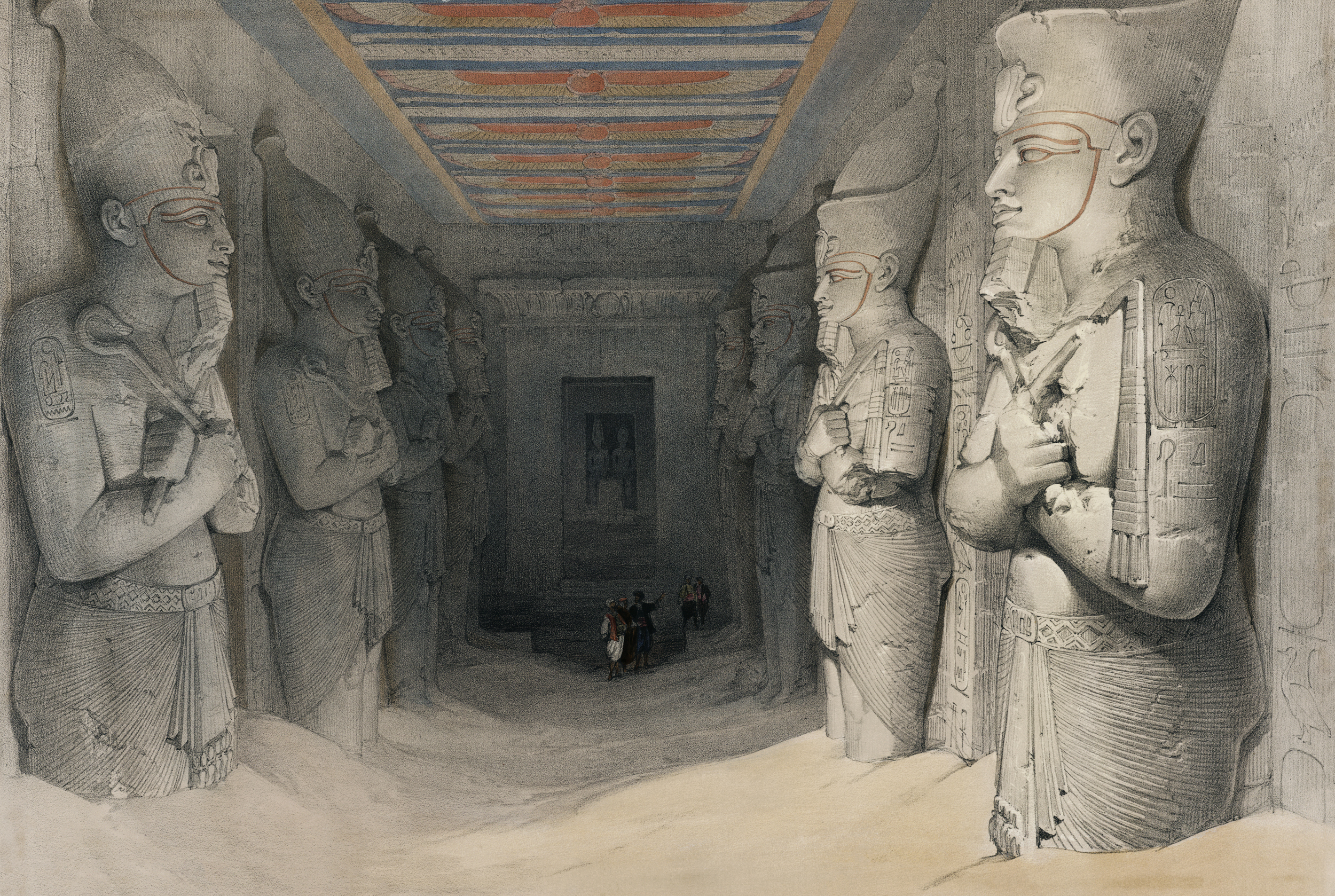
139. Interior of the Great Temple of Aboo-Simbel, Nubia.

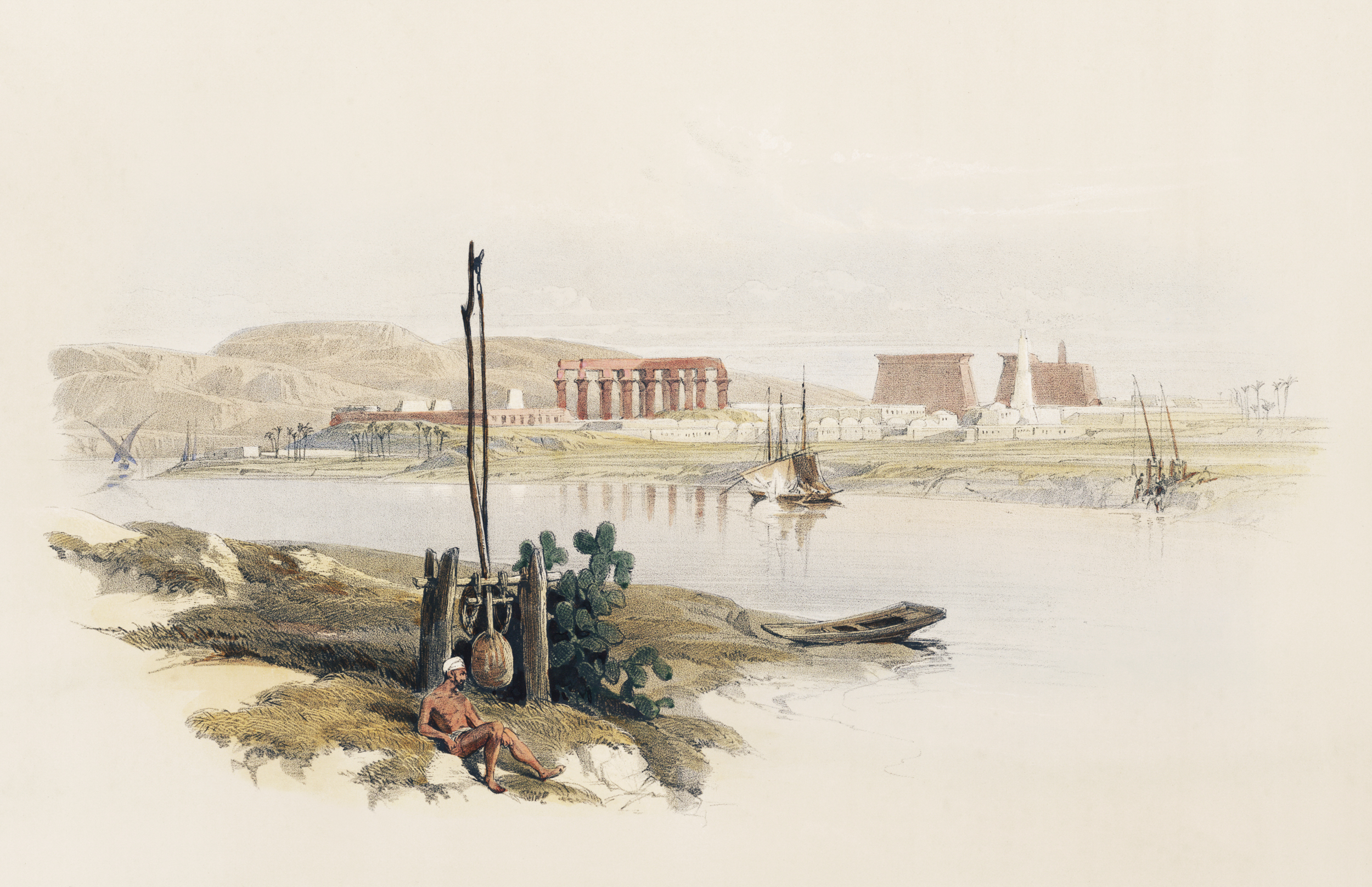
140. Ruins of Luxor from the S.W.

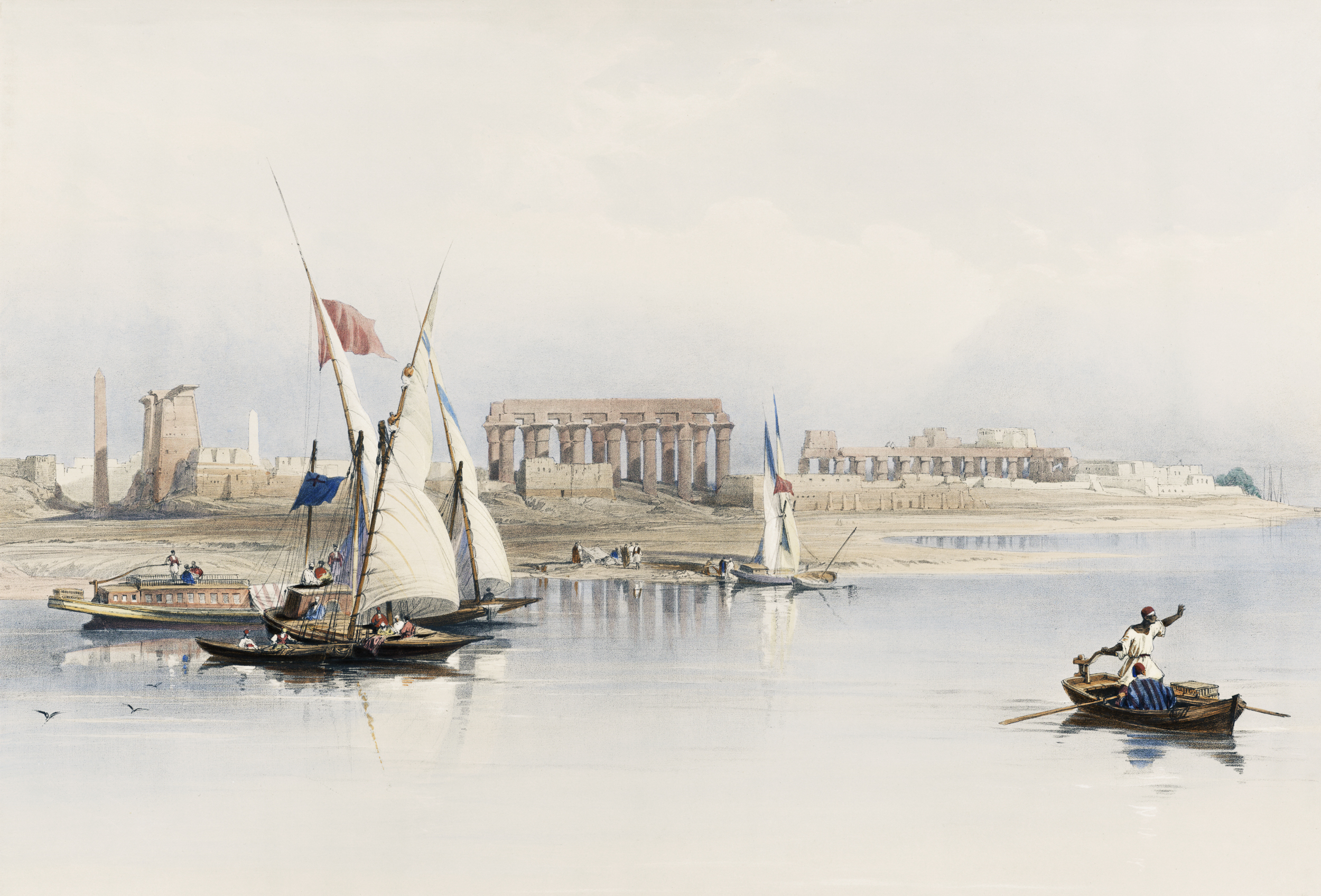
141. General view of the ruins of Luxor, from the Nile.

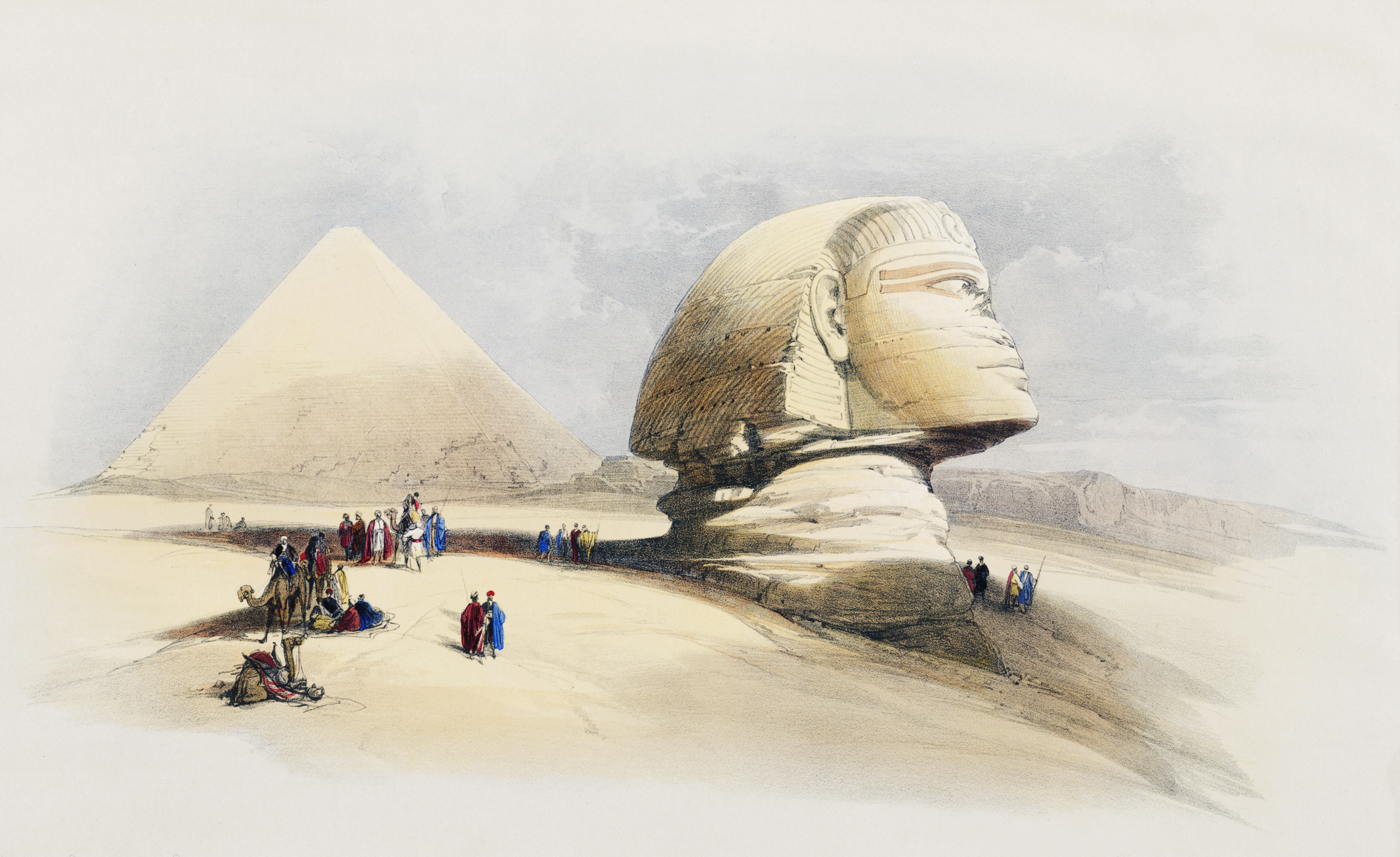
142. Side view of the Great Sphinx.

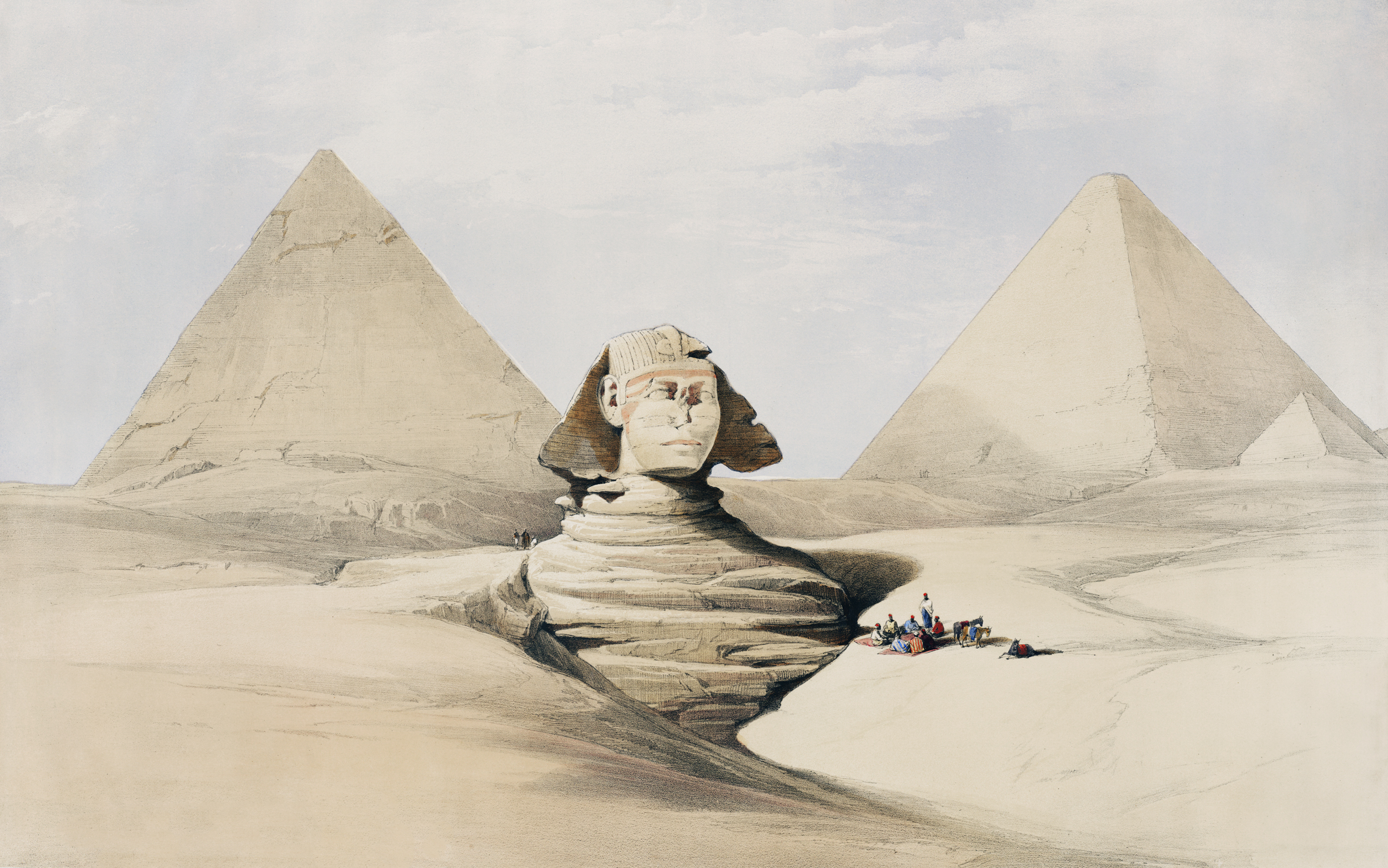
143. Head of the Great Sphnix, Pyramids of Egypt.

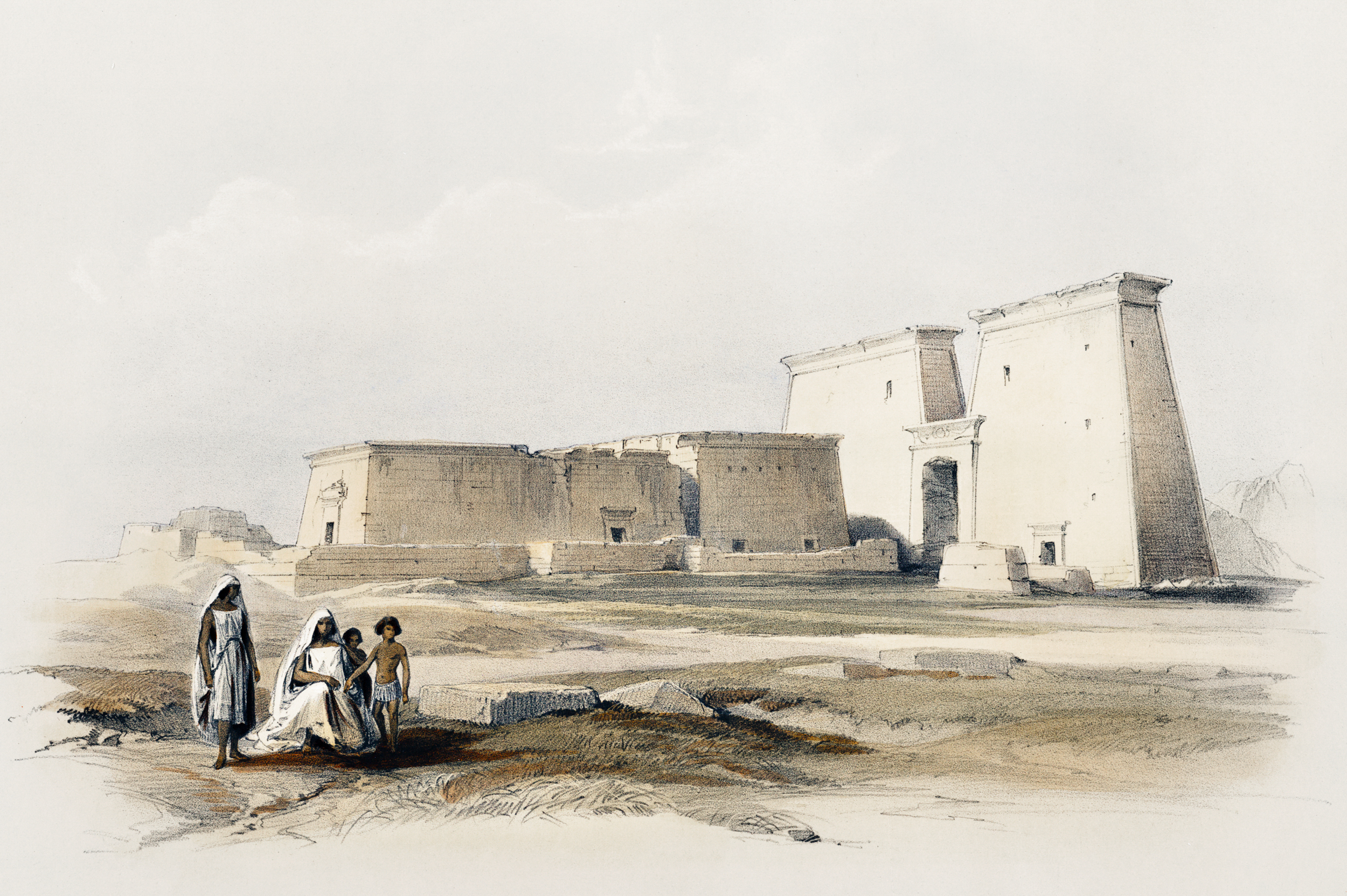
144. Temple of Dakke, Nubia.

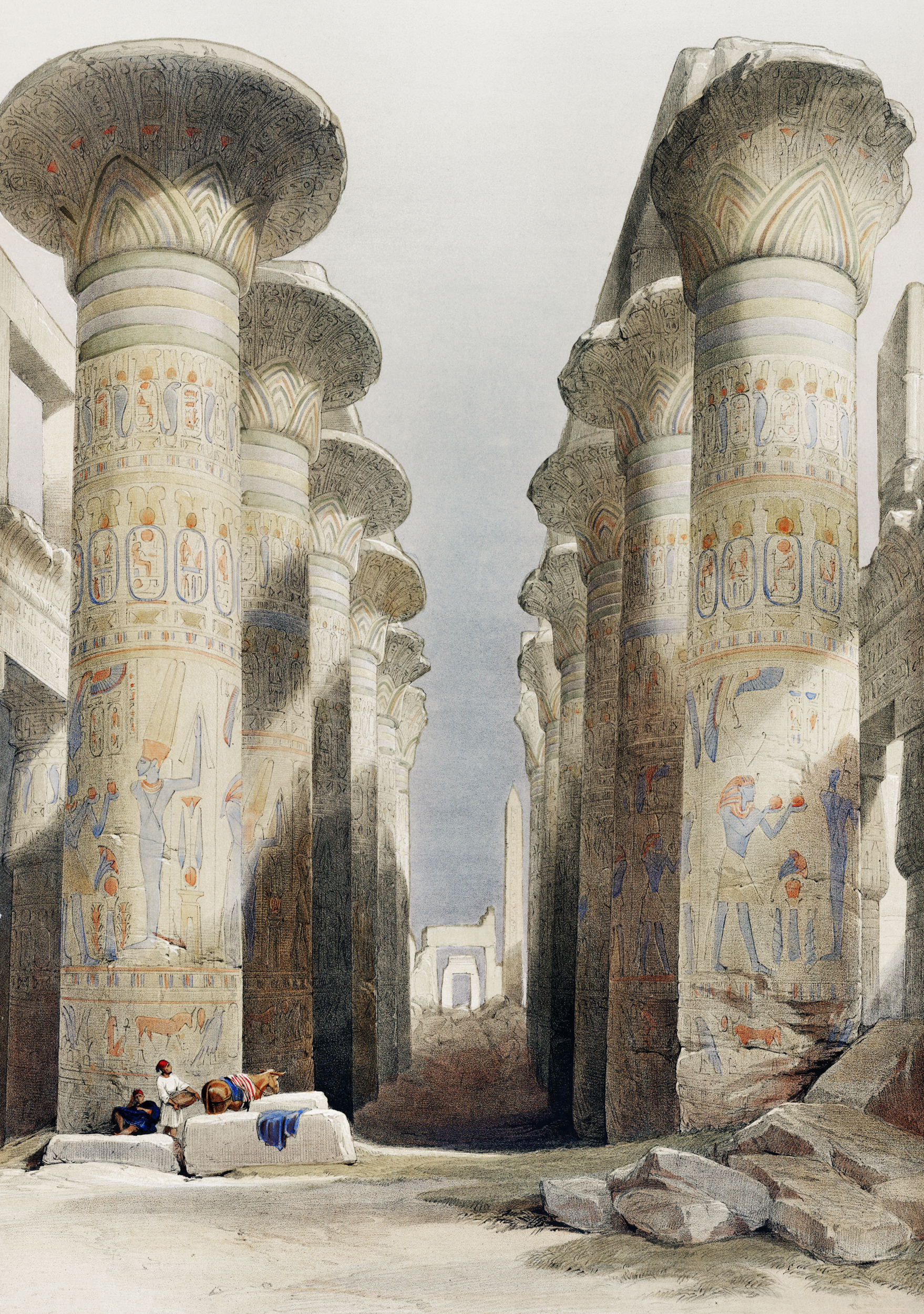
145. Central Avenue of the Great Hall of Columns at Karnac.

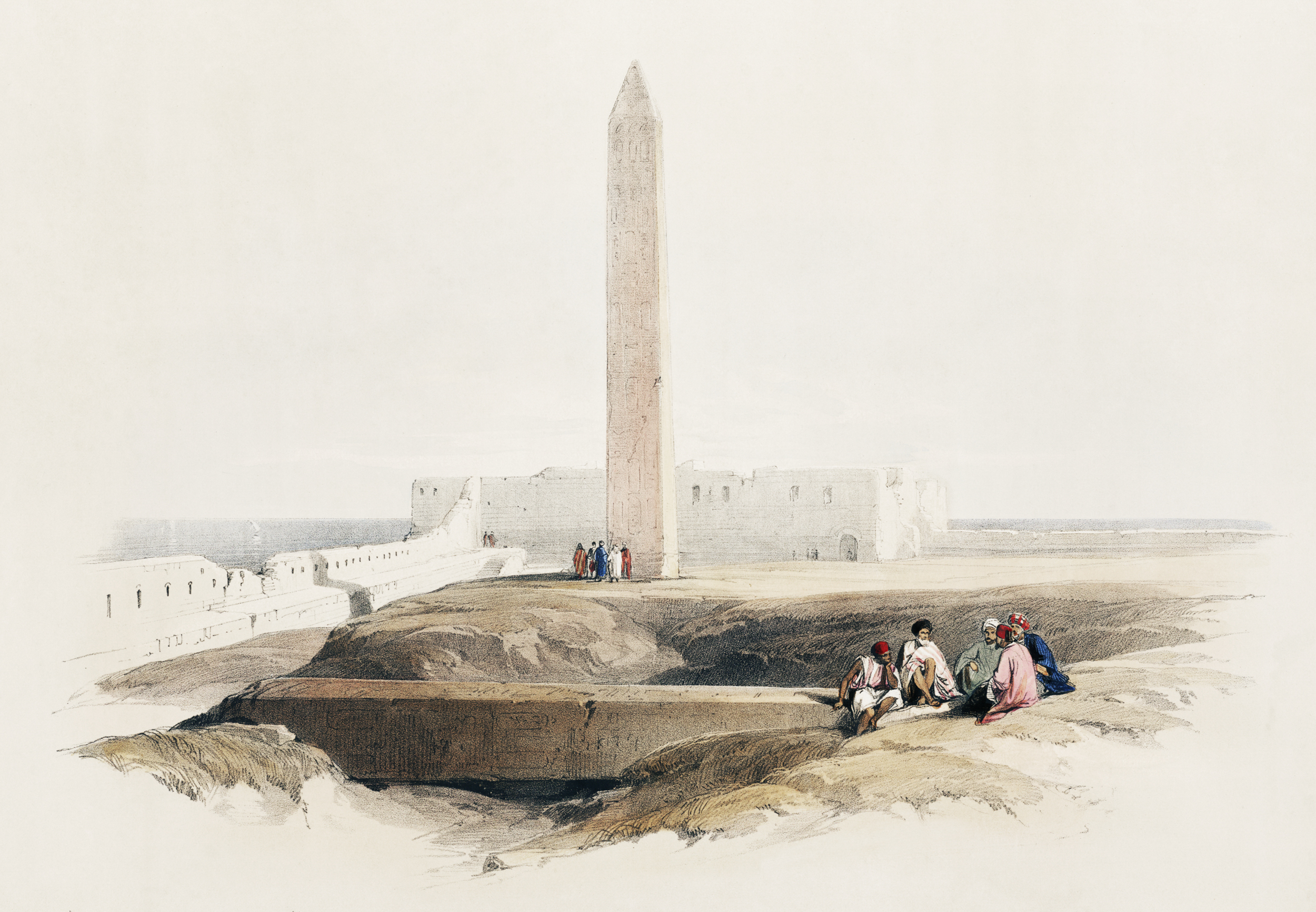
146. Cleopatra's Needles.

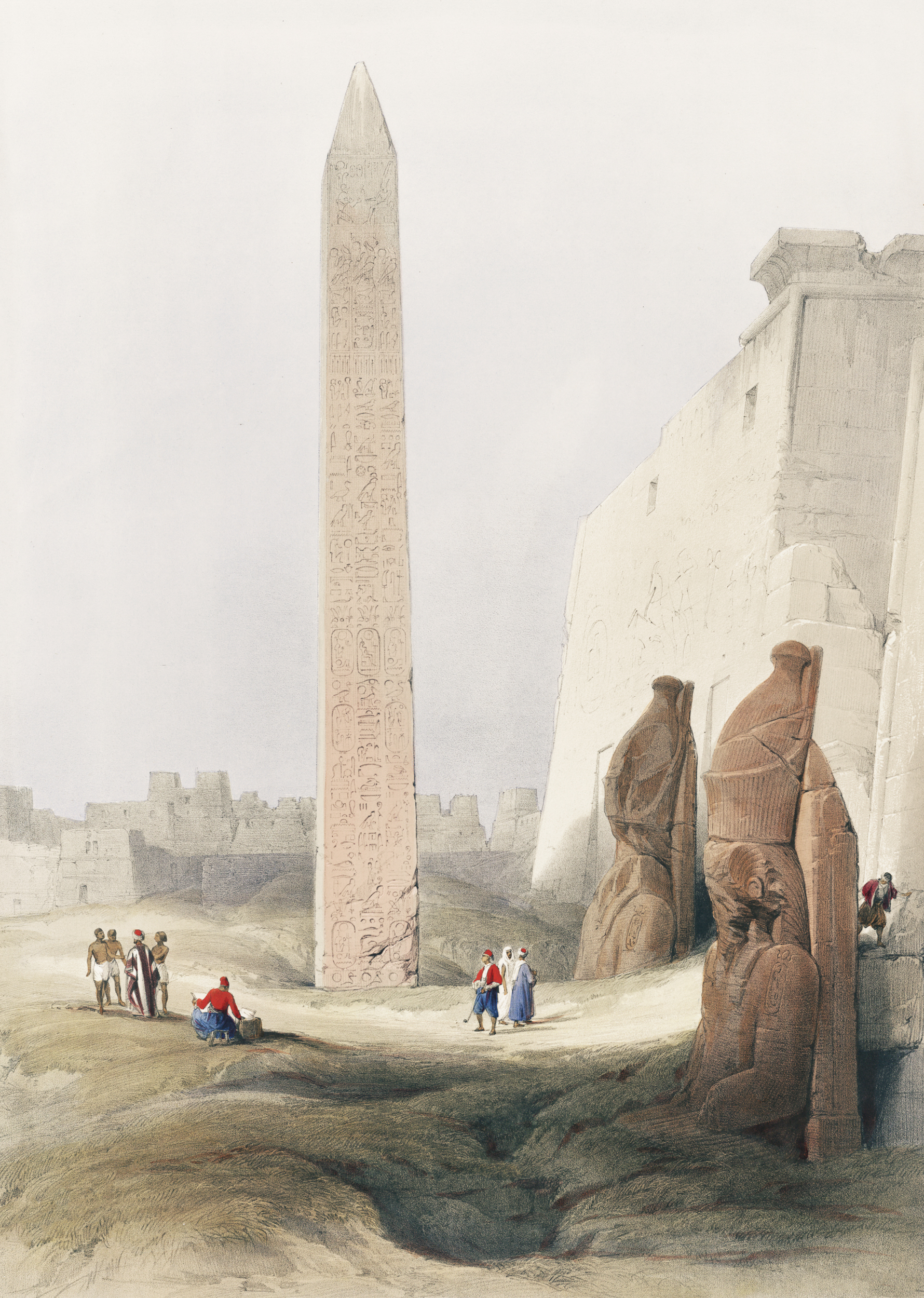
147. Obelisk of Luxor.

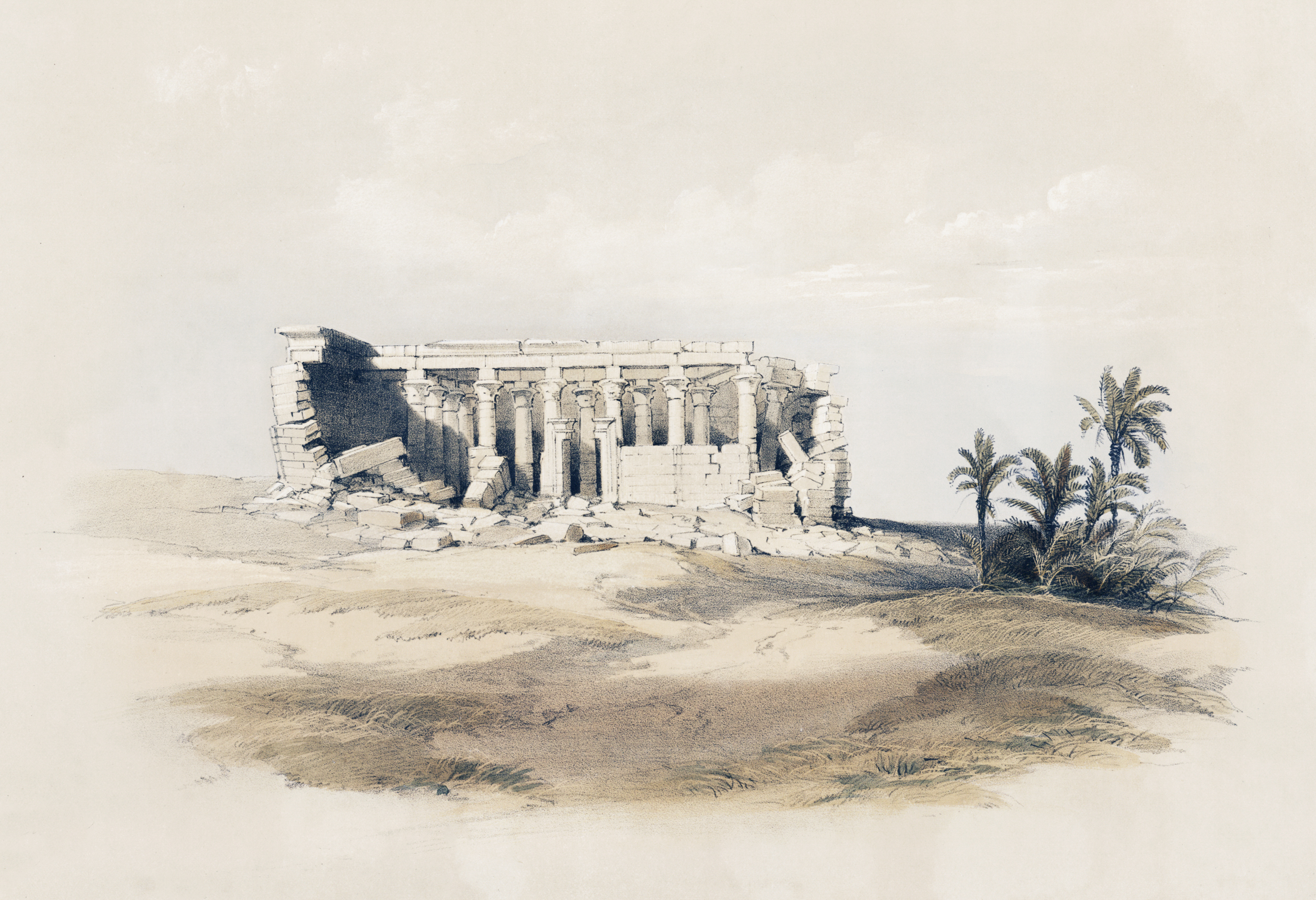
148. Ruins of Maharaka, Nubia.

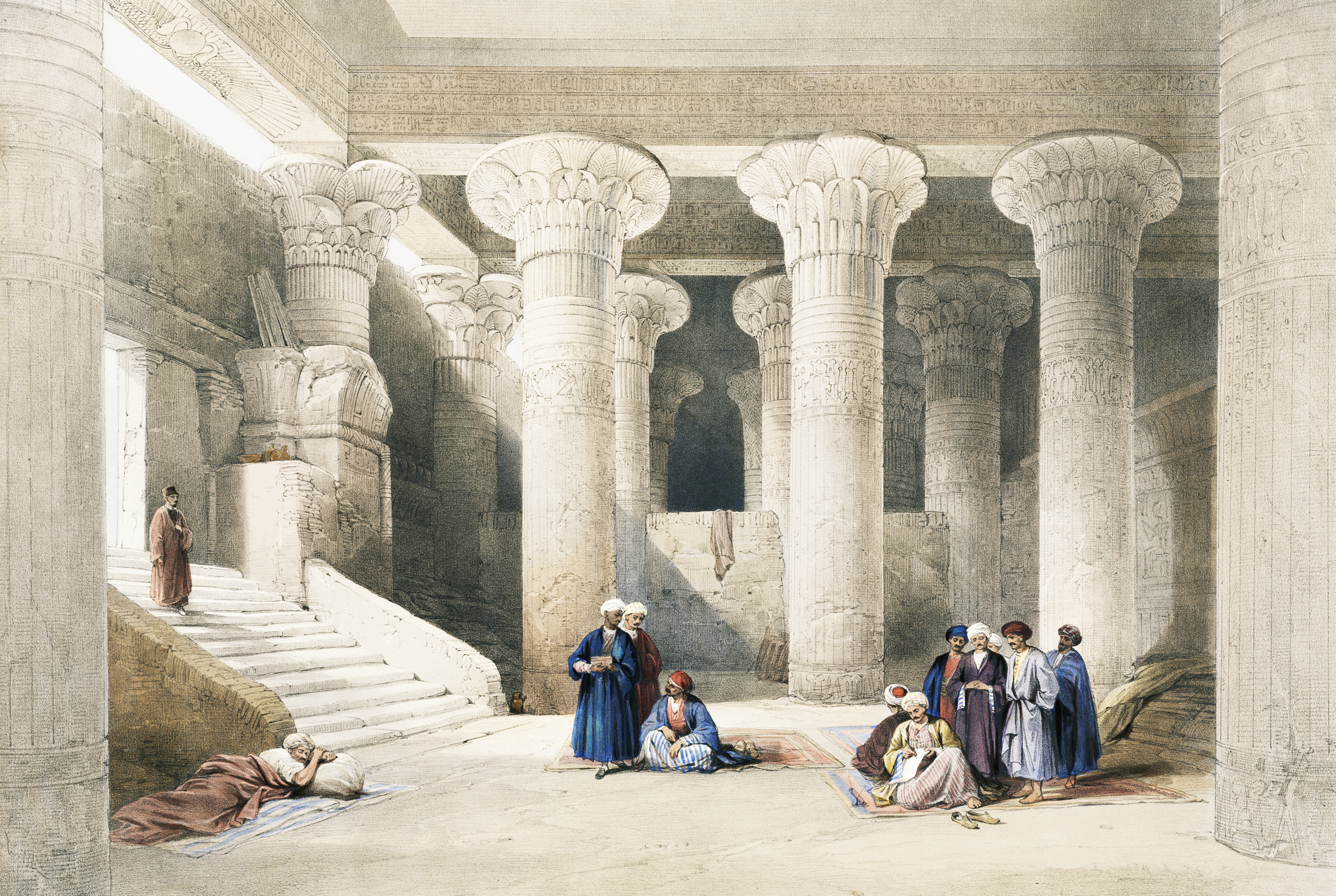
149. Interior of the Temple of Esne, Upper Egypt.

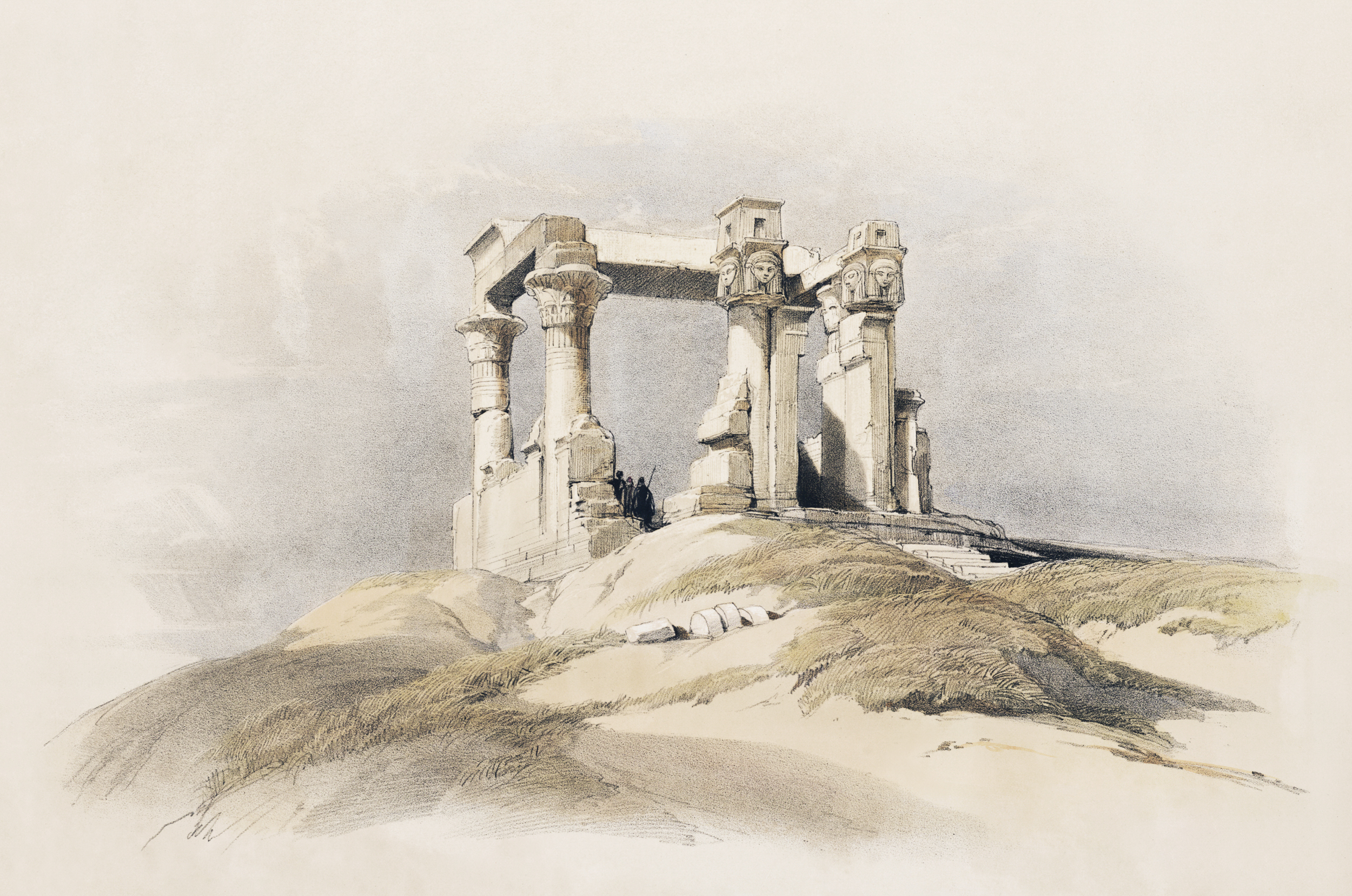
150. Temple of Wady Kardassy, Nubia.

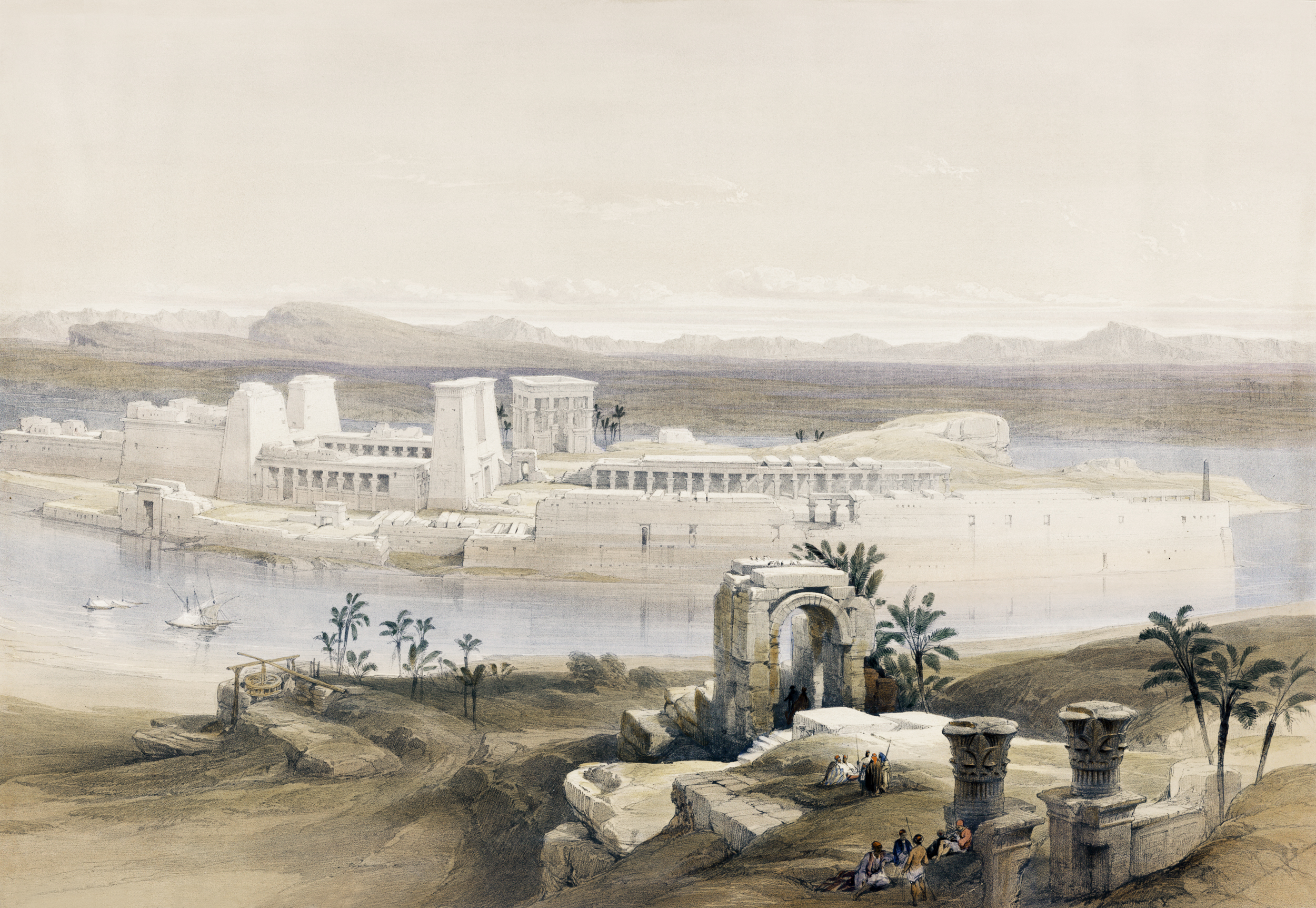
151. General view of the Island of Philoe, Nubia.

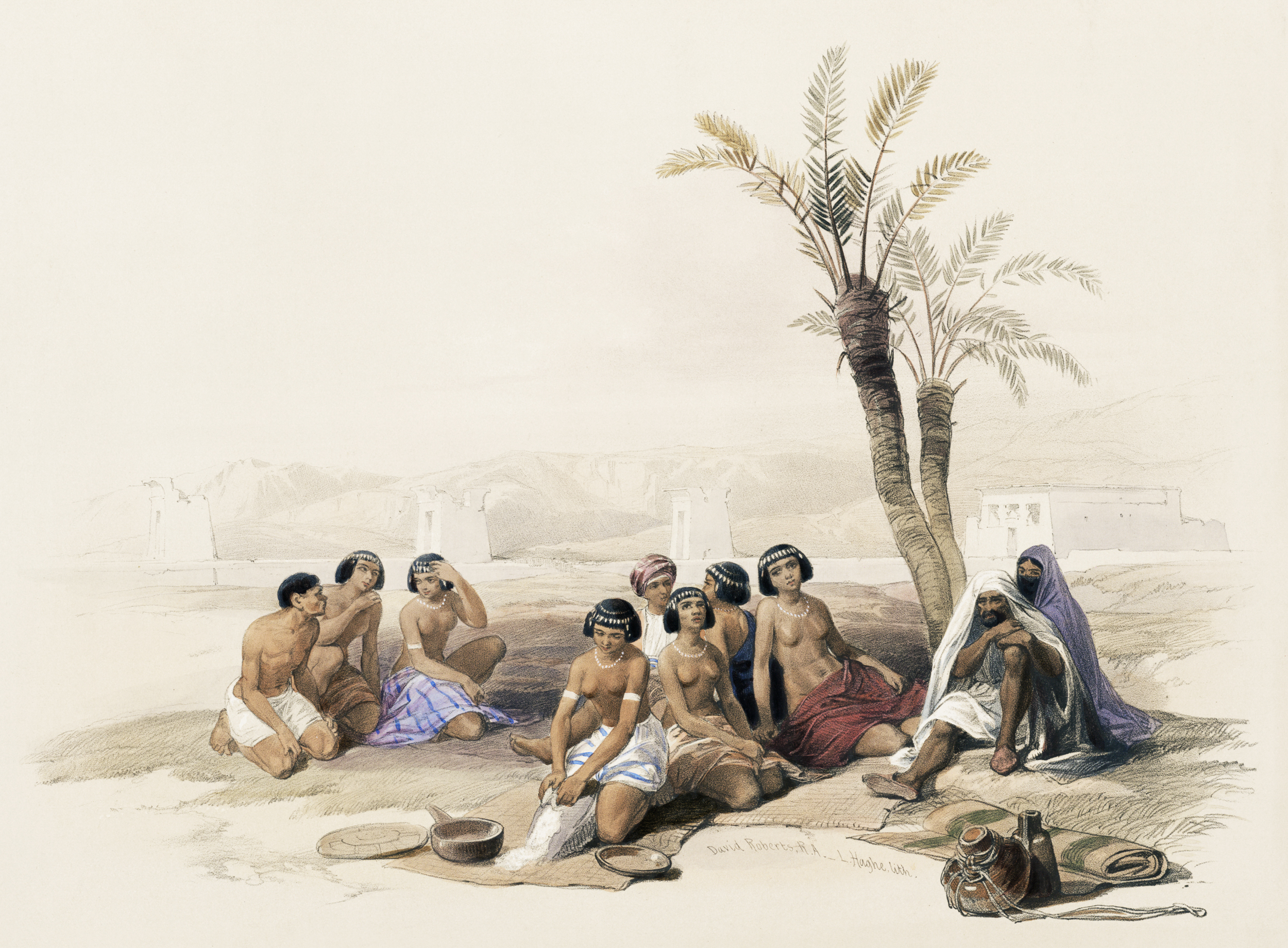
152. Abyssinian Slaves at Korth.

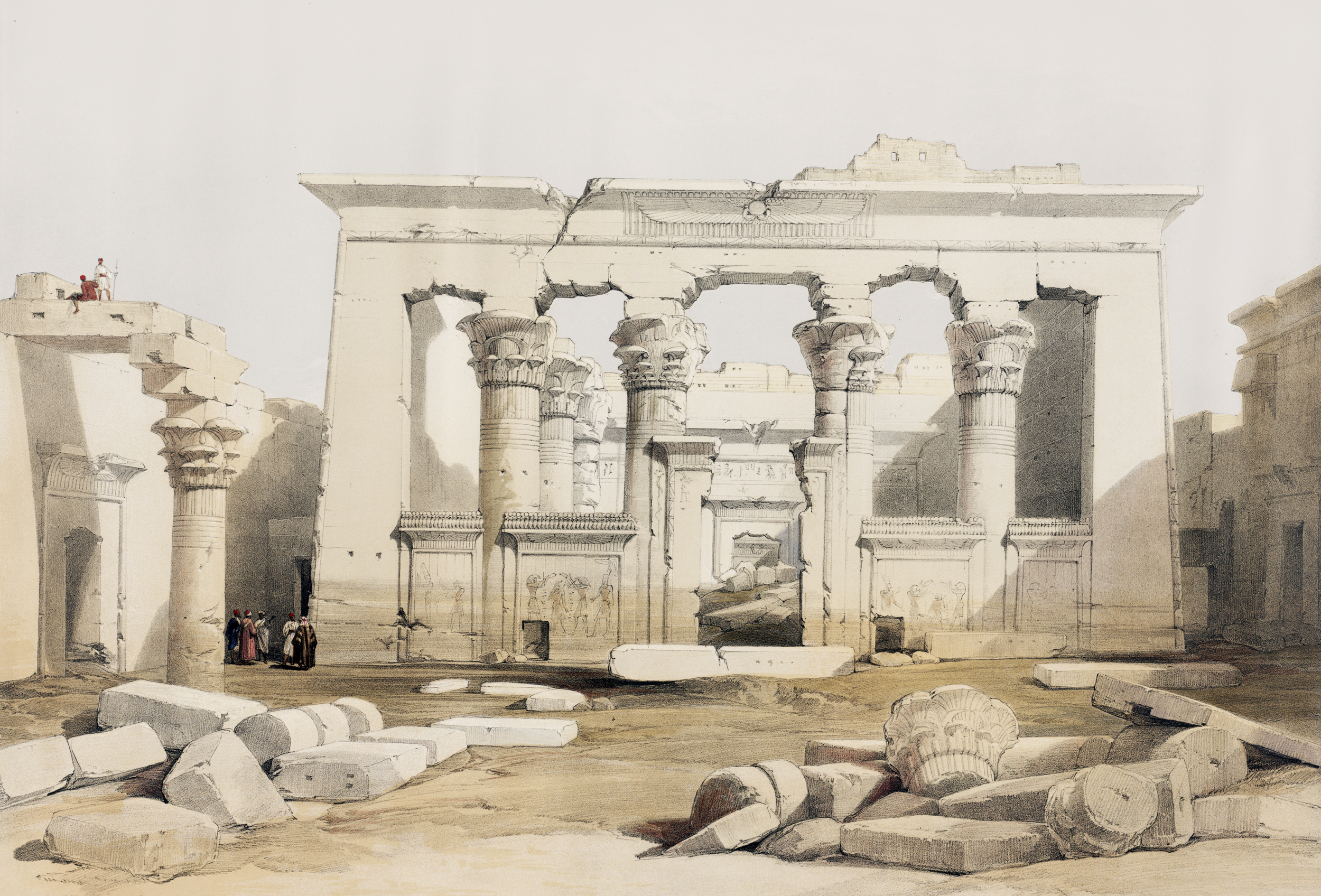
153. Portico of the Temple of Kalabshe, Nubia.

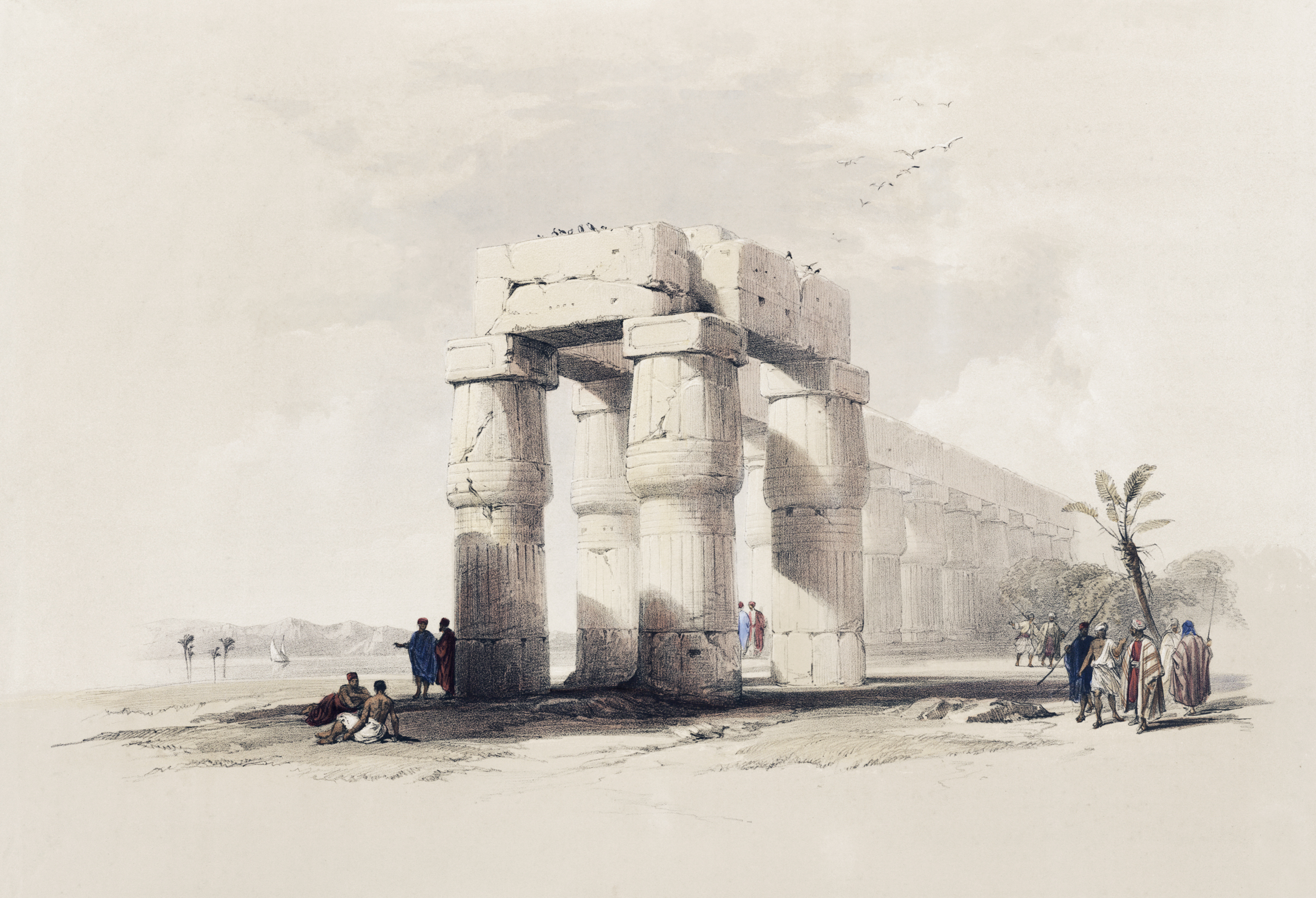
154. View at Luxor, Thebes.

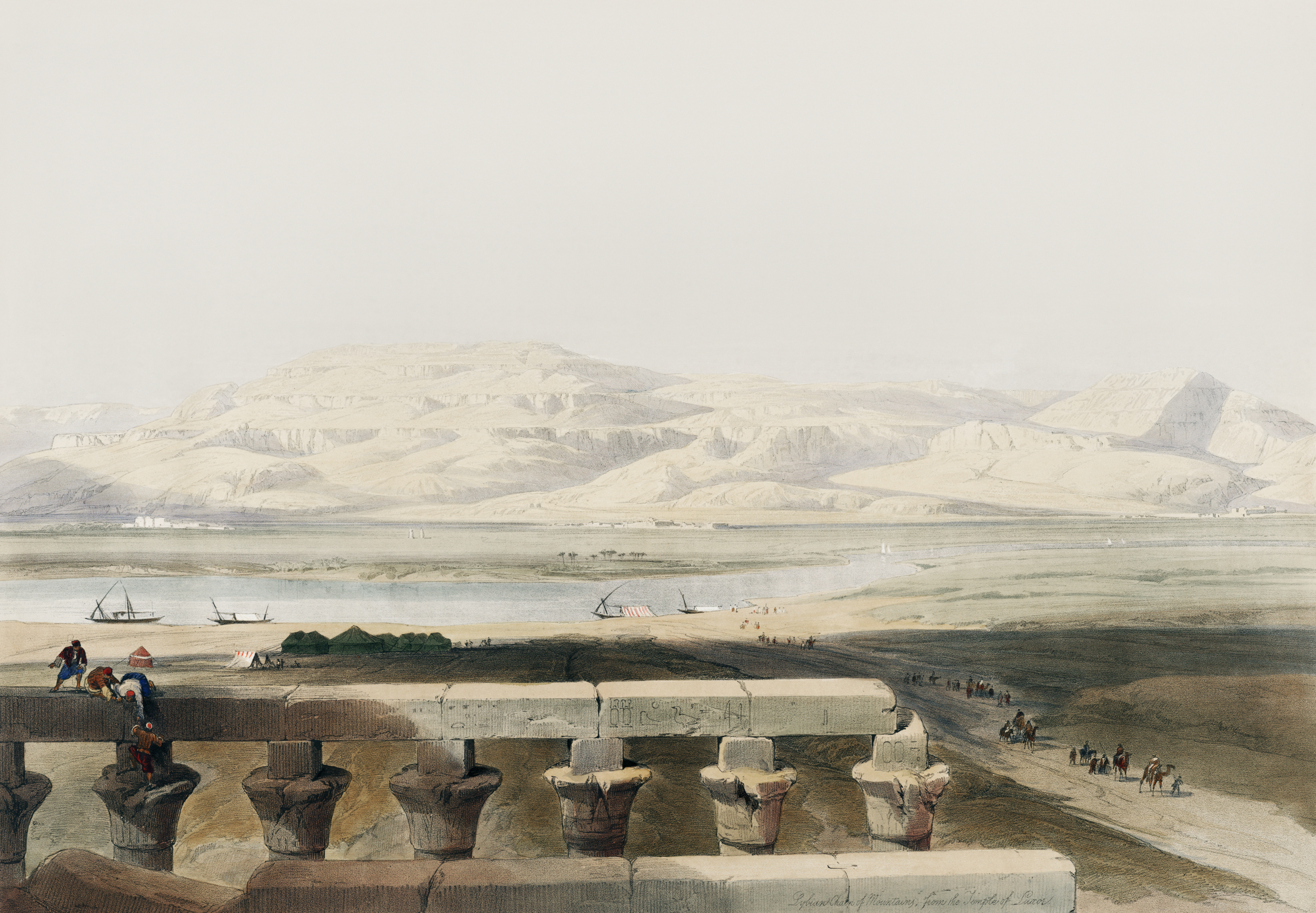
155. Libyan Chain of Mountains, from the Temple of Luxor.

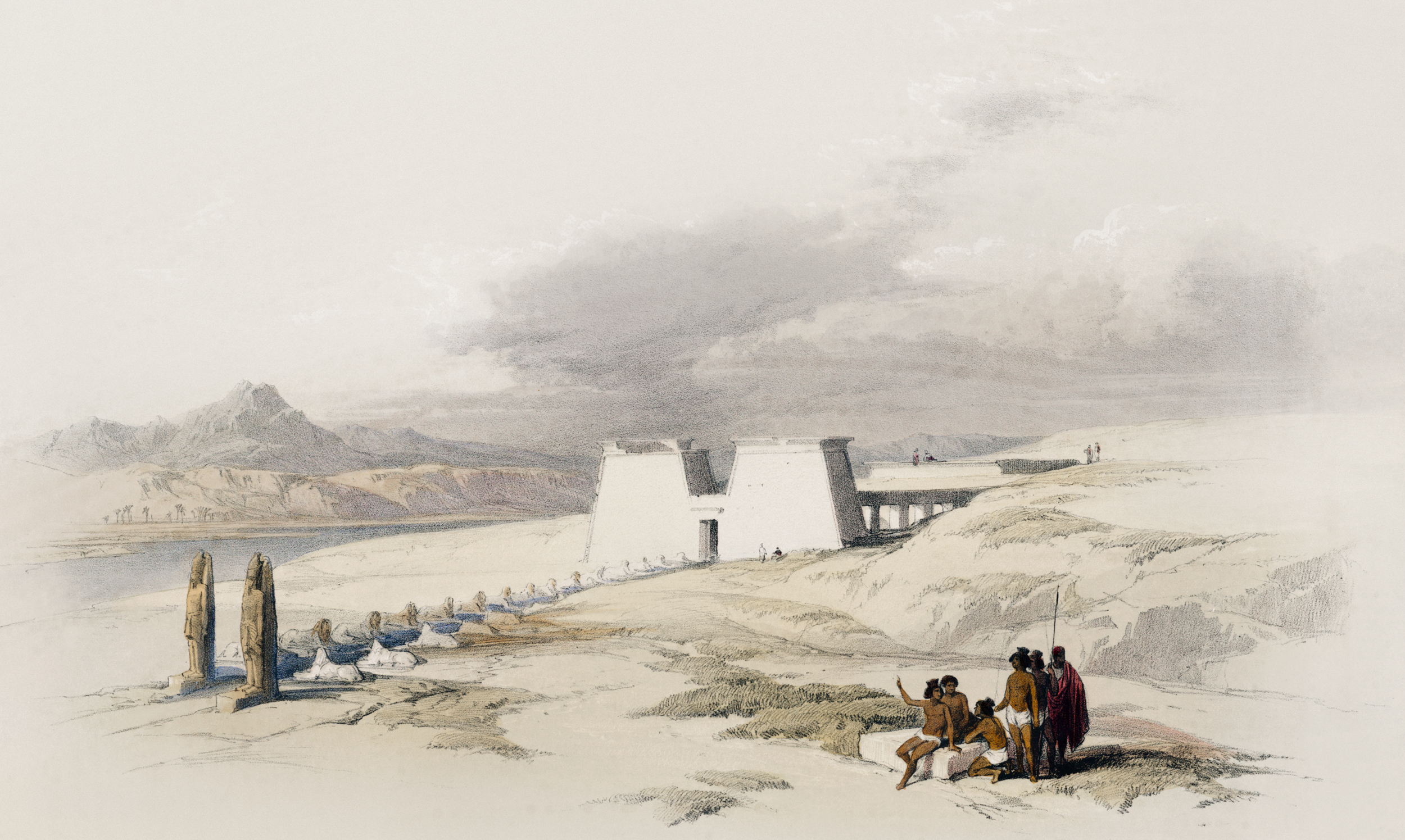
156. Approach to the Temple of Wady Saboua, Nubia.

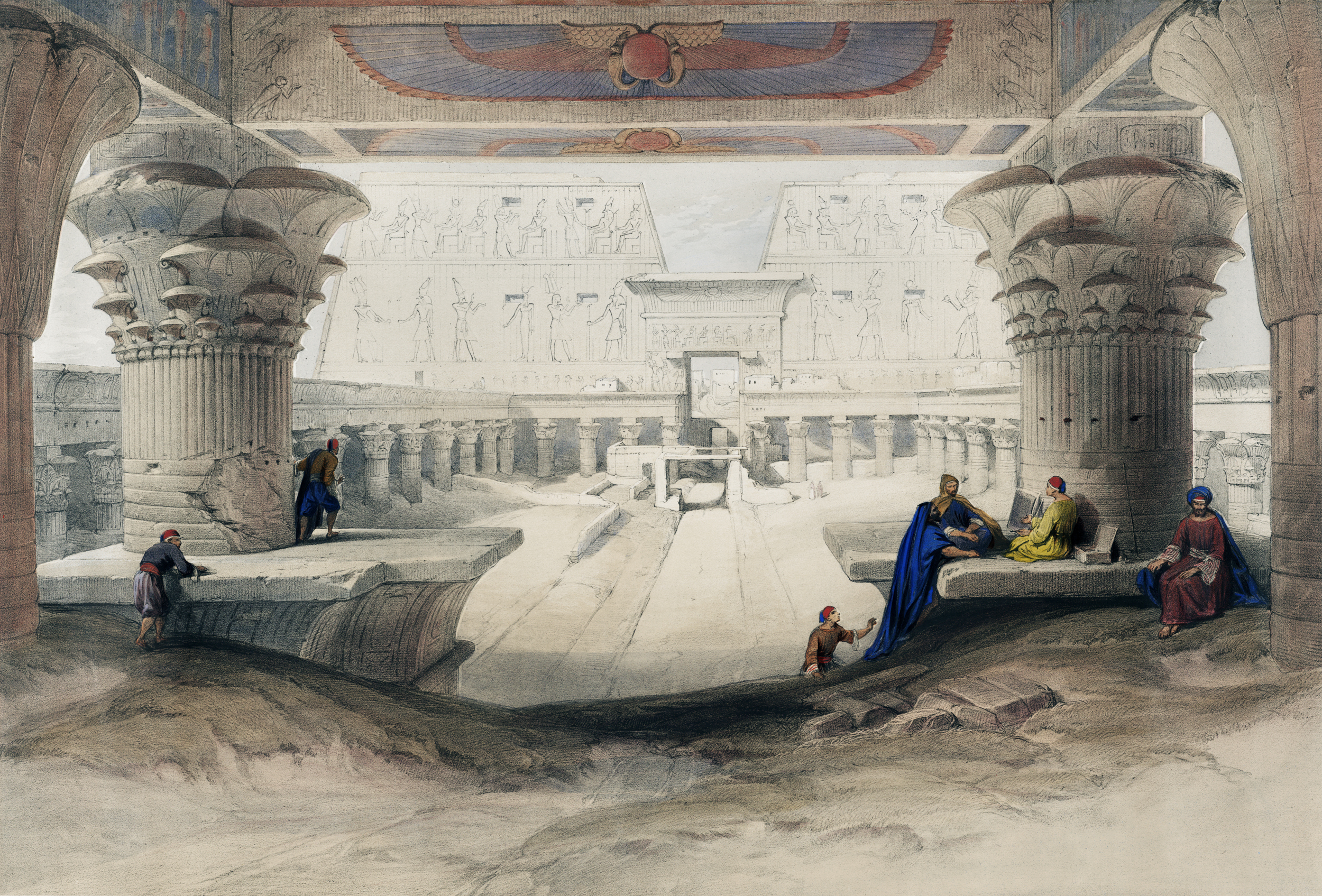
157. View from under the Portico of the Temple of Edfou, Upper Egypt.

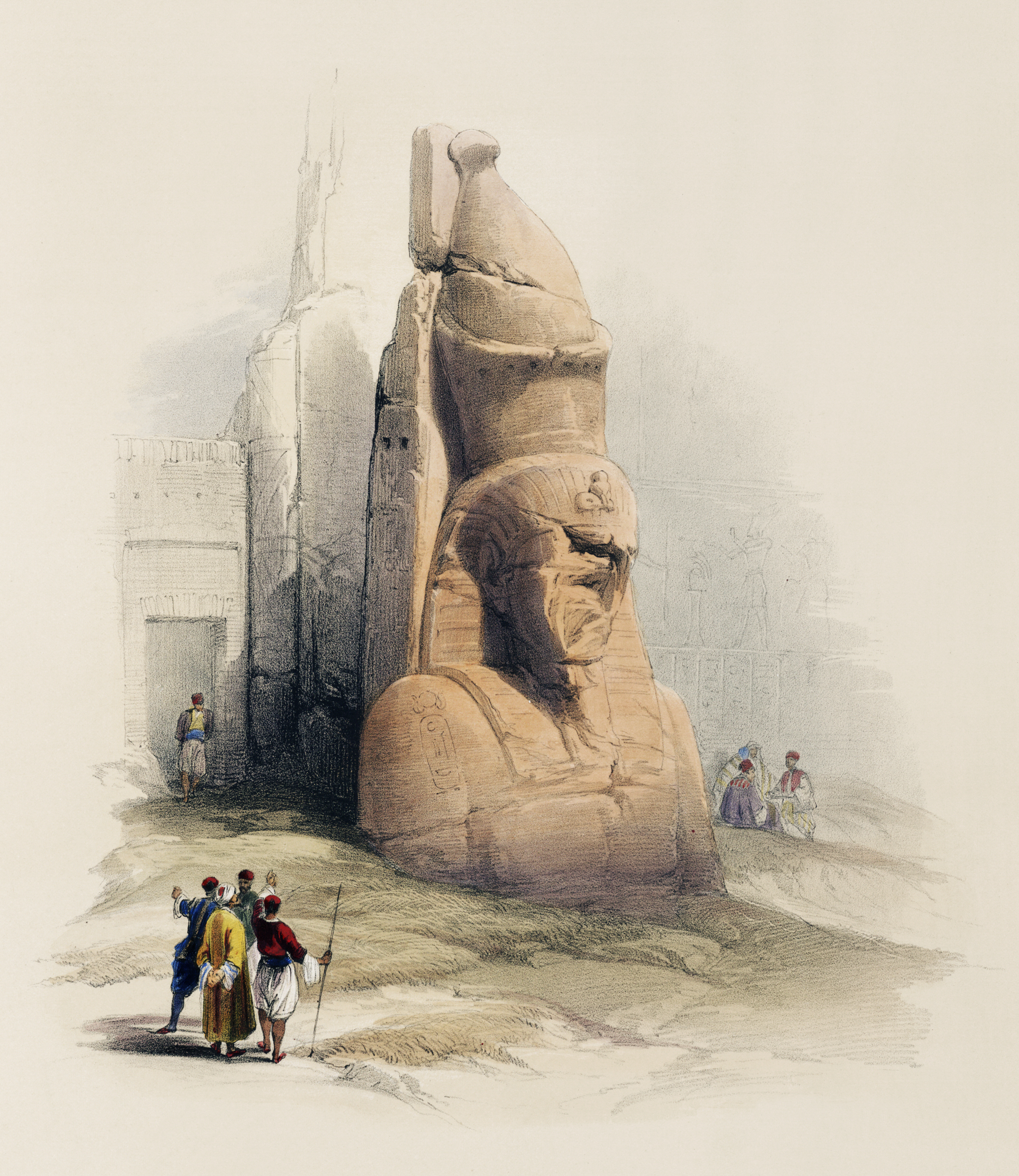
158. Colossal statue at the entrance to the Temple of Luxor.

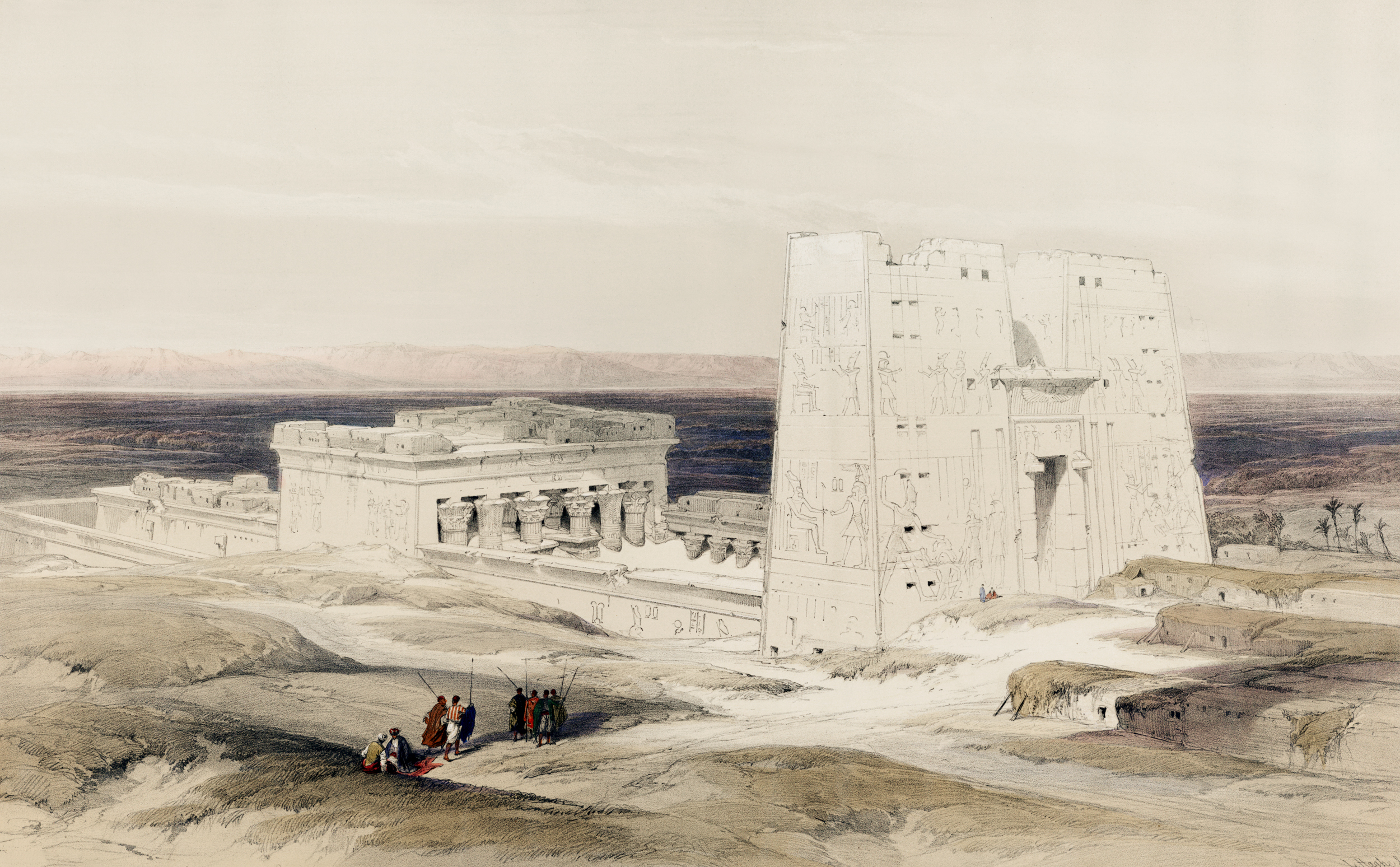
159. Temple of Edfou: Ancient Apollinopolis, Upper Egypt.

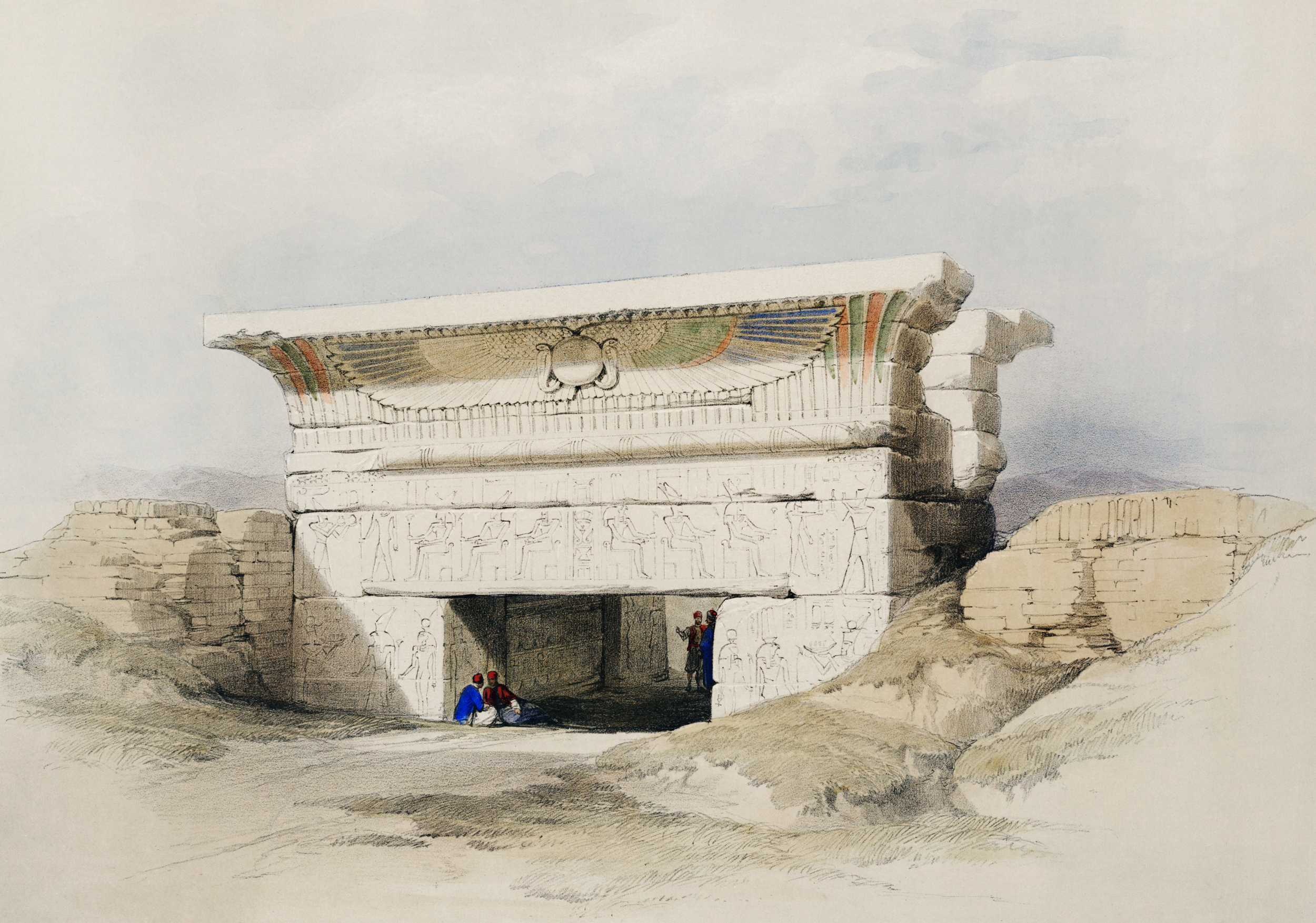
160. Gateway at Dendera.

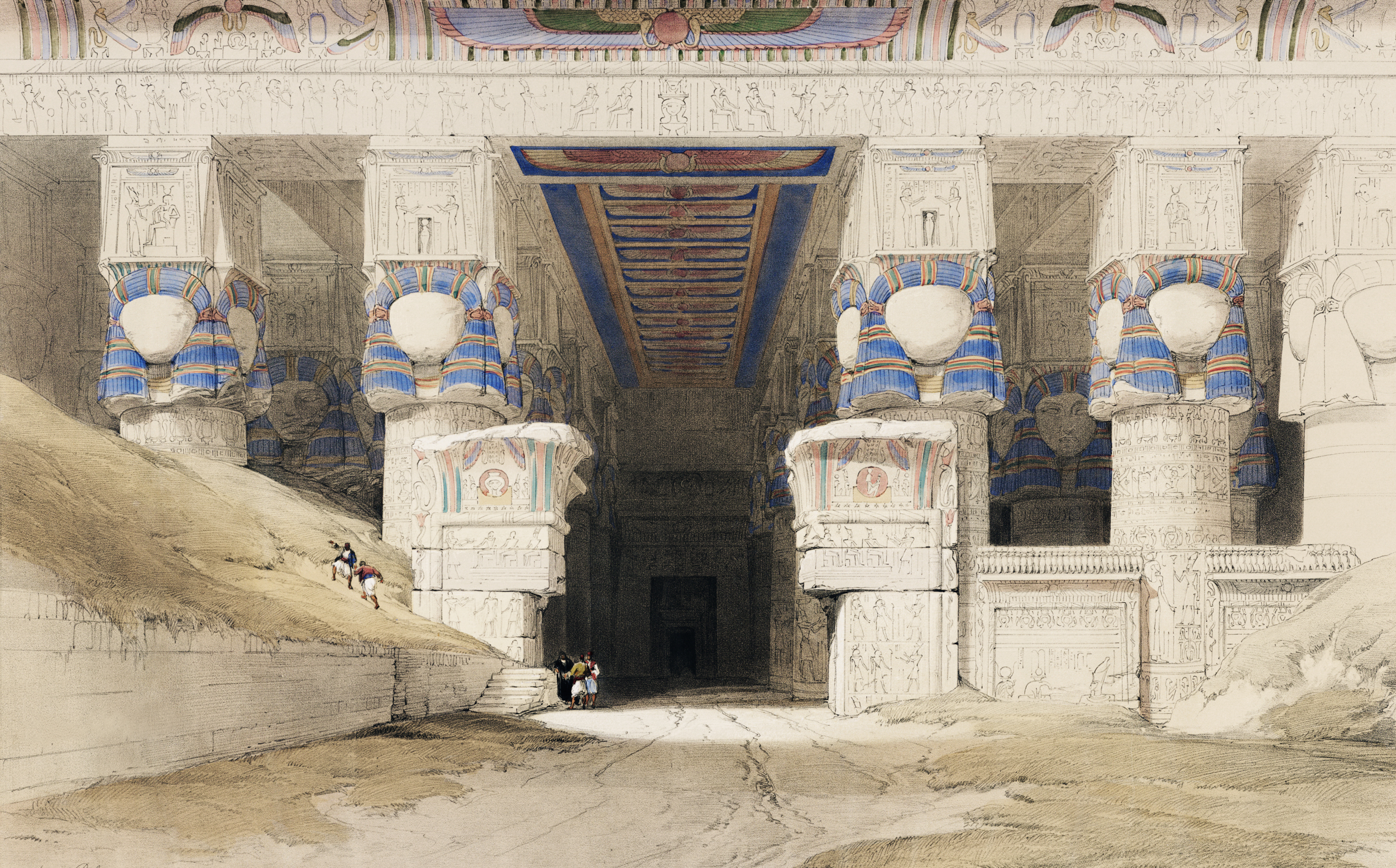
161. Portico of the Temple of Dendera.

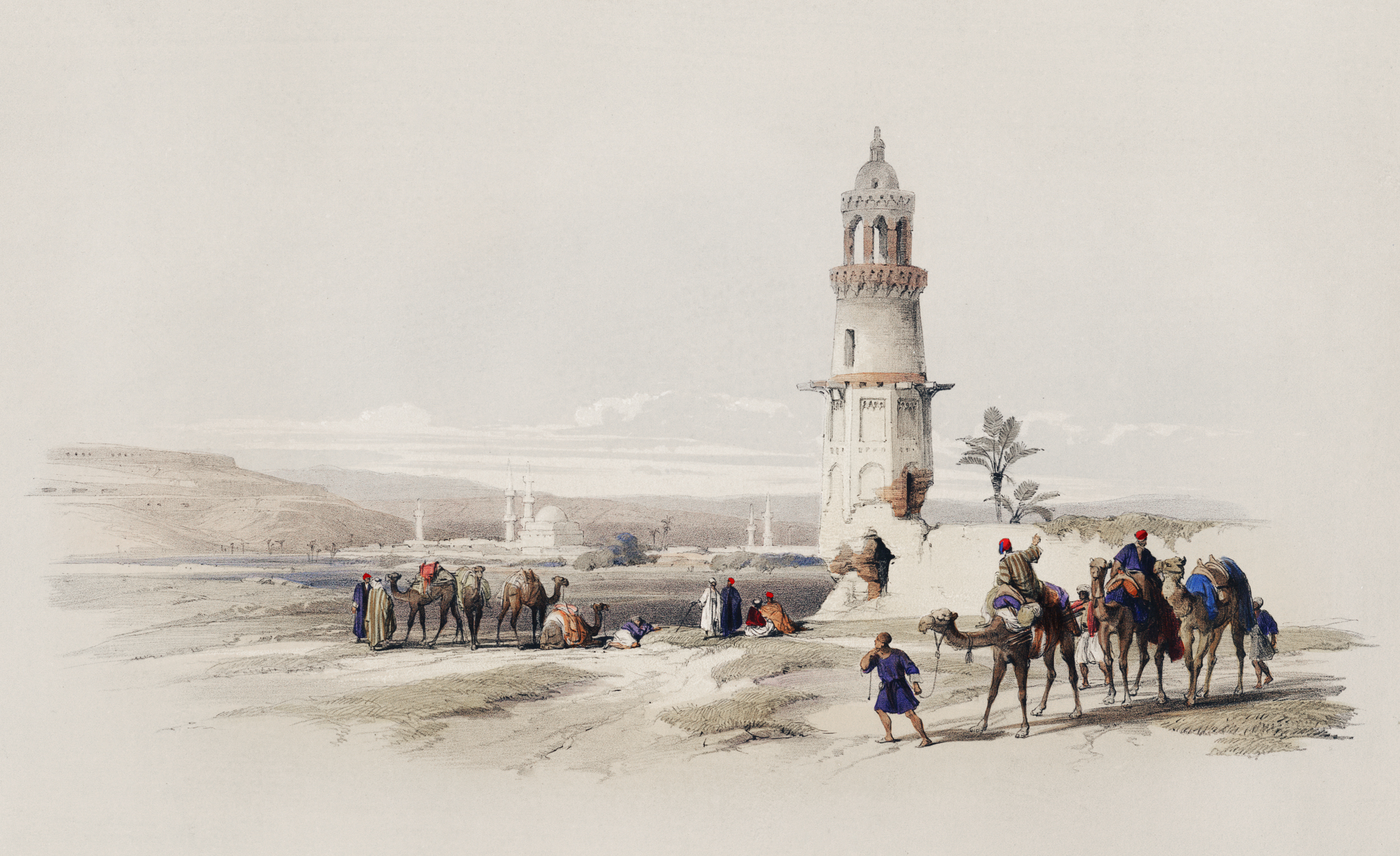
162. Siout.

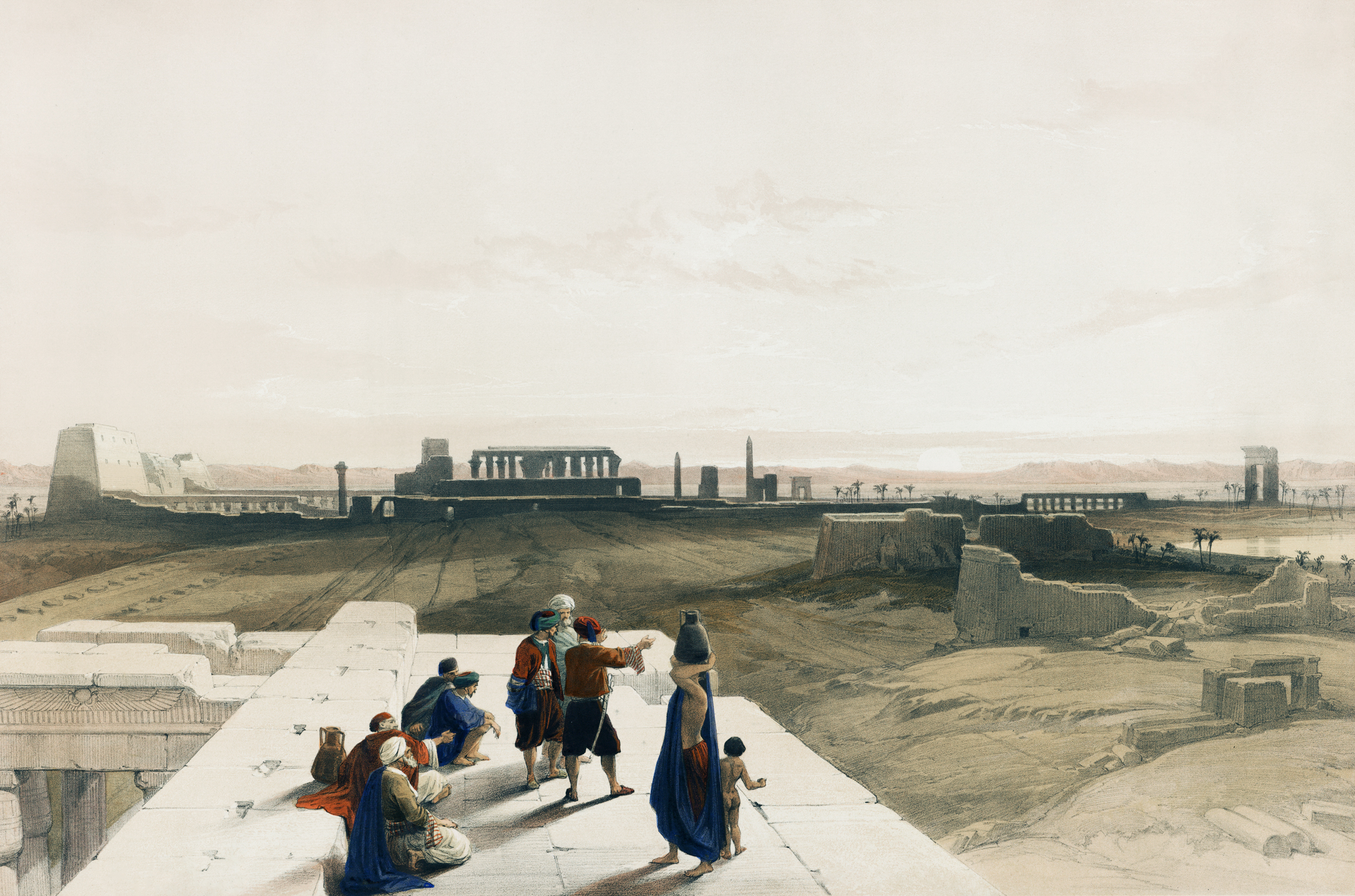
163. General view of the ruins of Karnac, from the West.

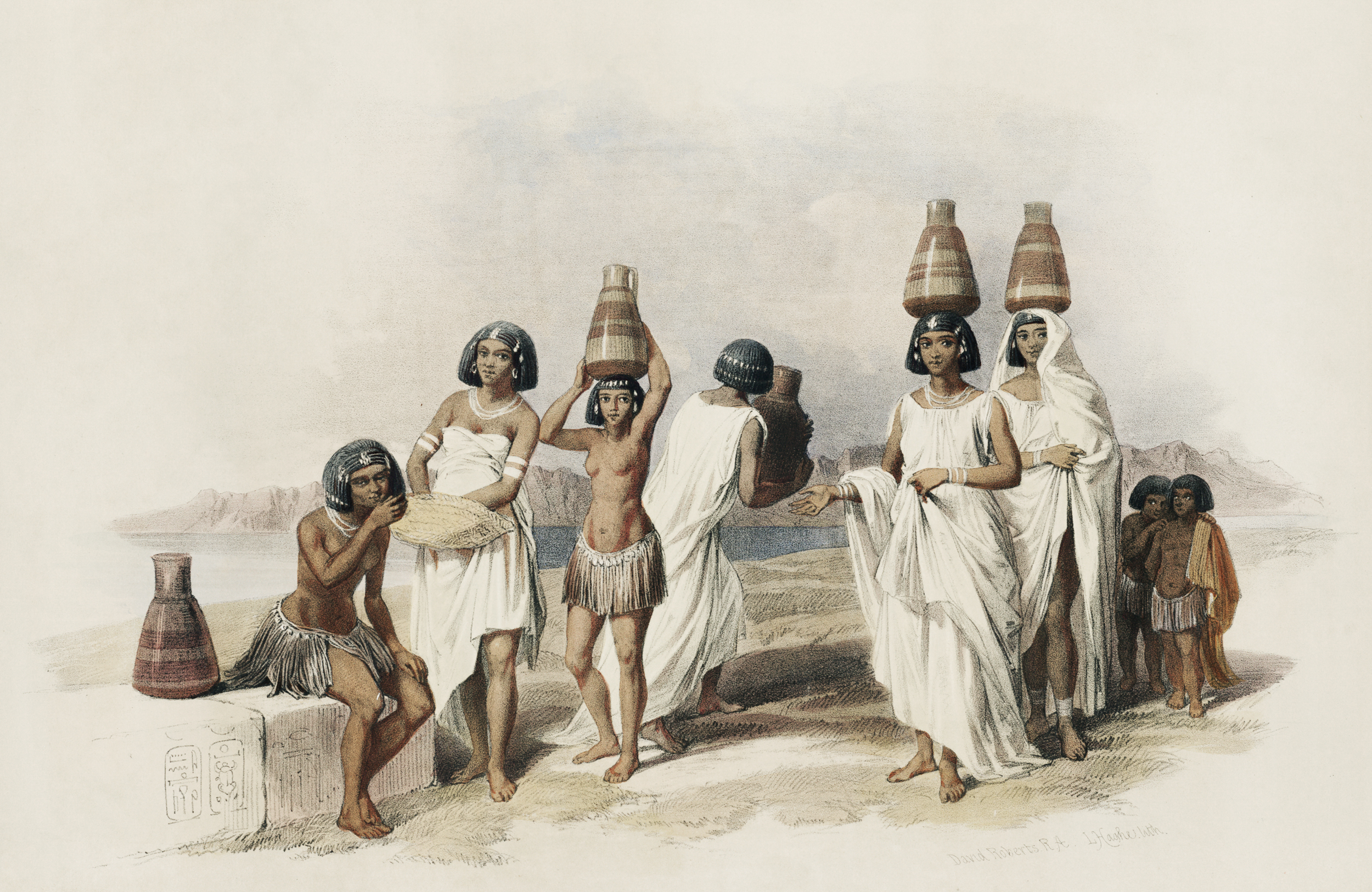
164. Nubian Women at Korti.

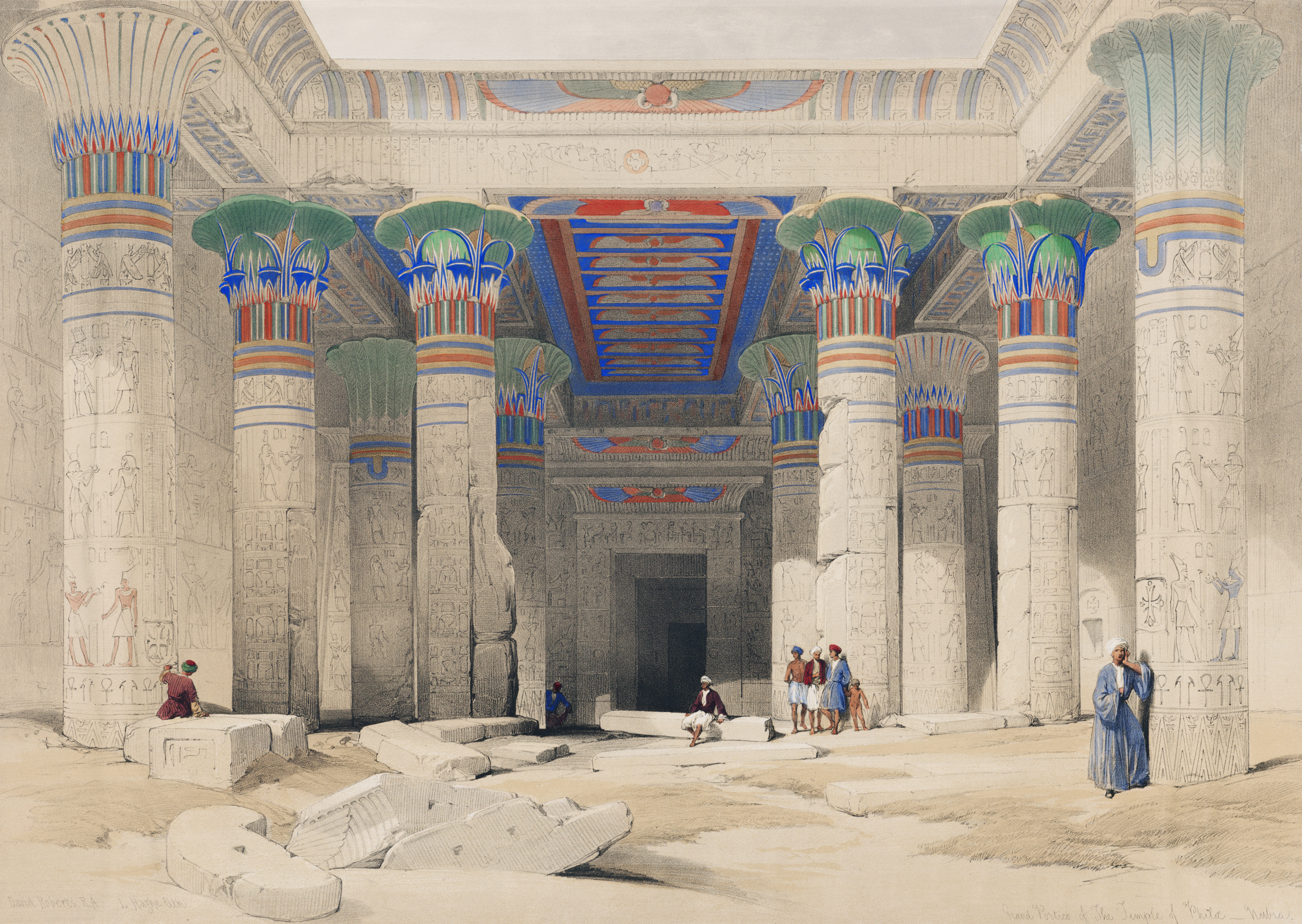
165. Grand Portico of the Temple of Philoe, Nubia.

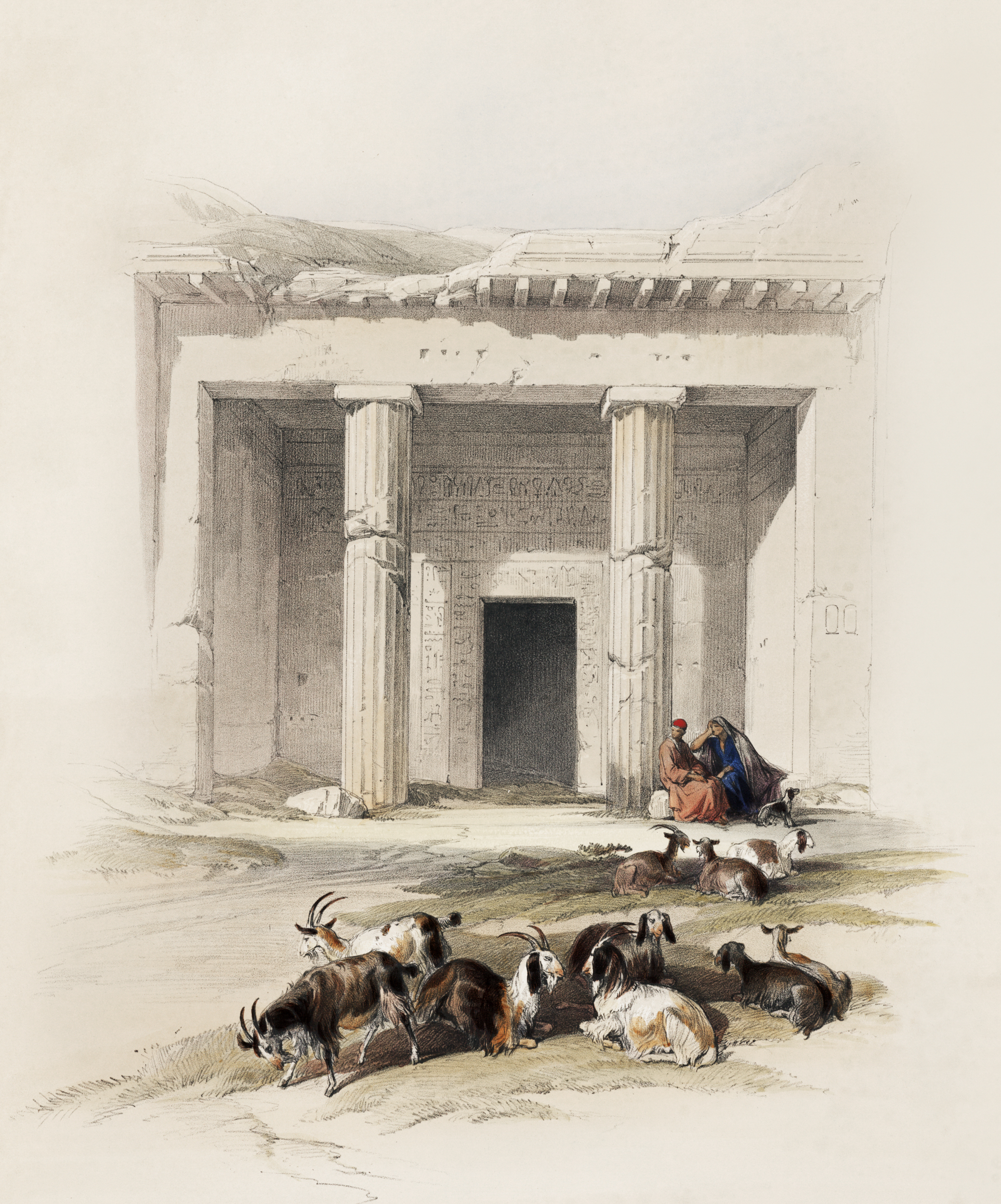
166. Entrance to the Caves at Beni-Hassan.

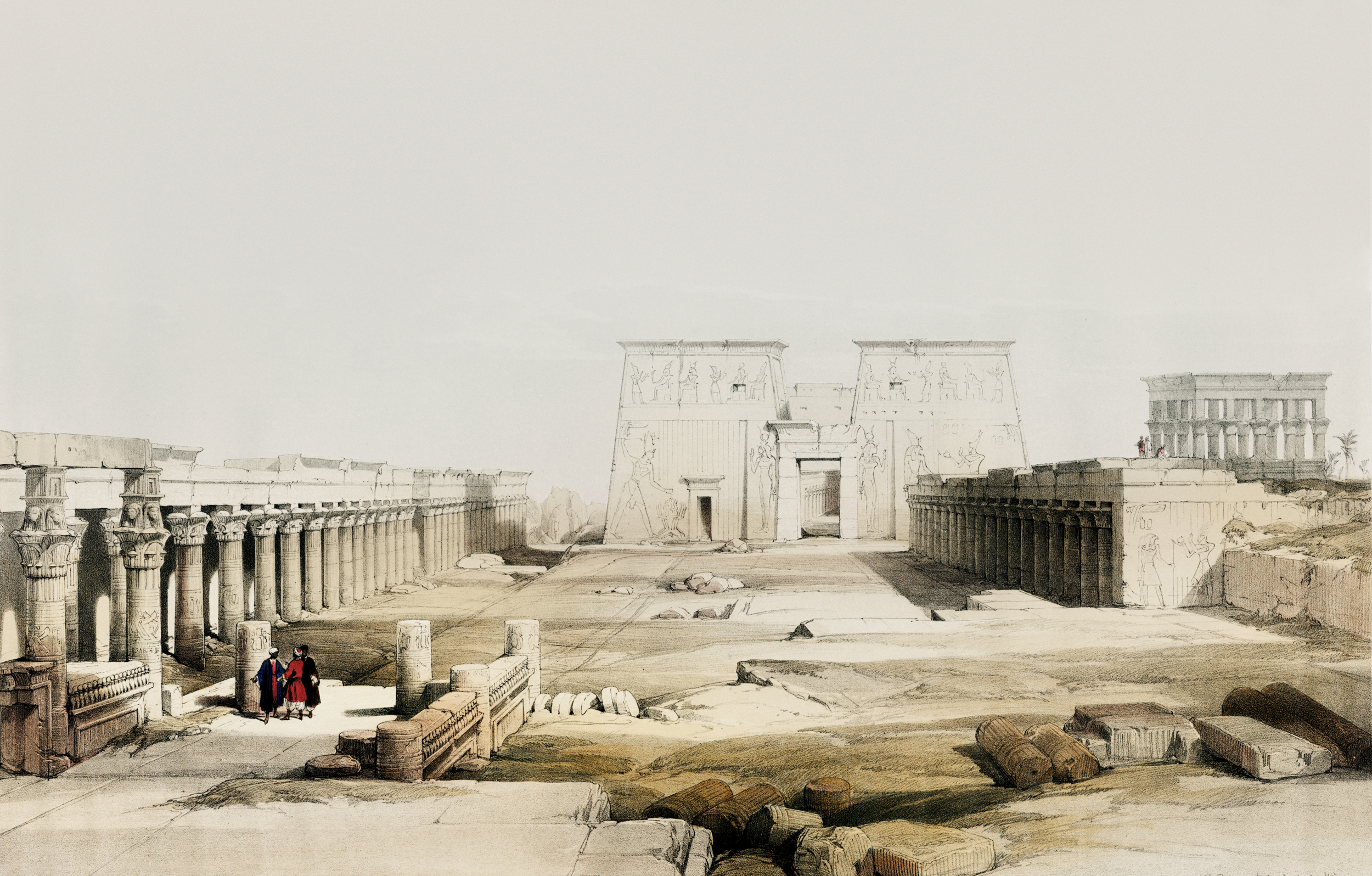
167. Grand approach to the Temple of Philoe, Nubia.

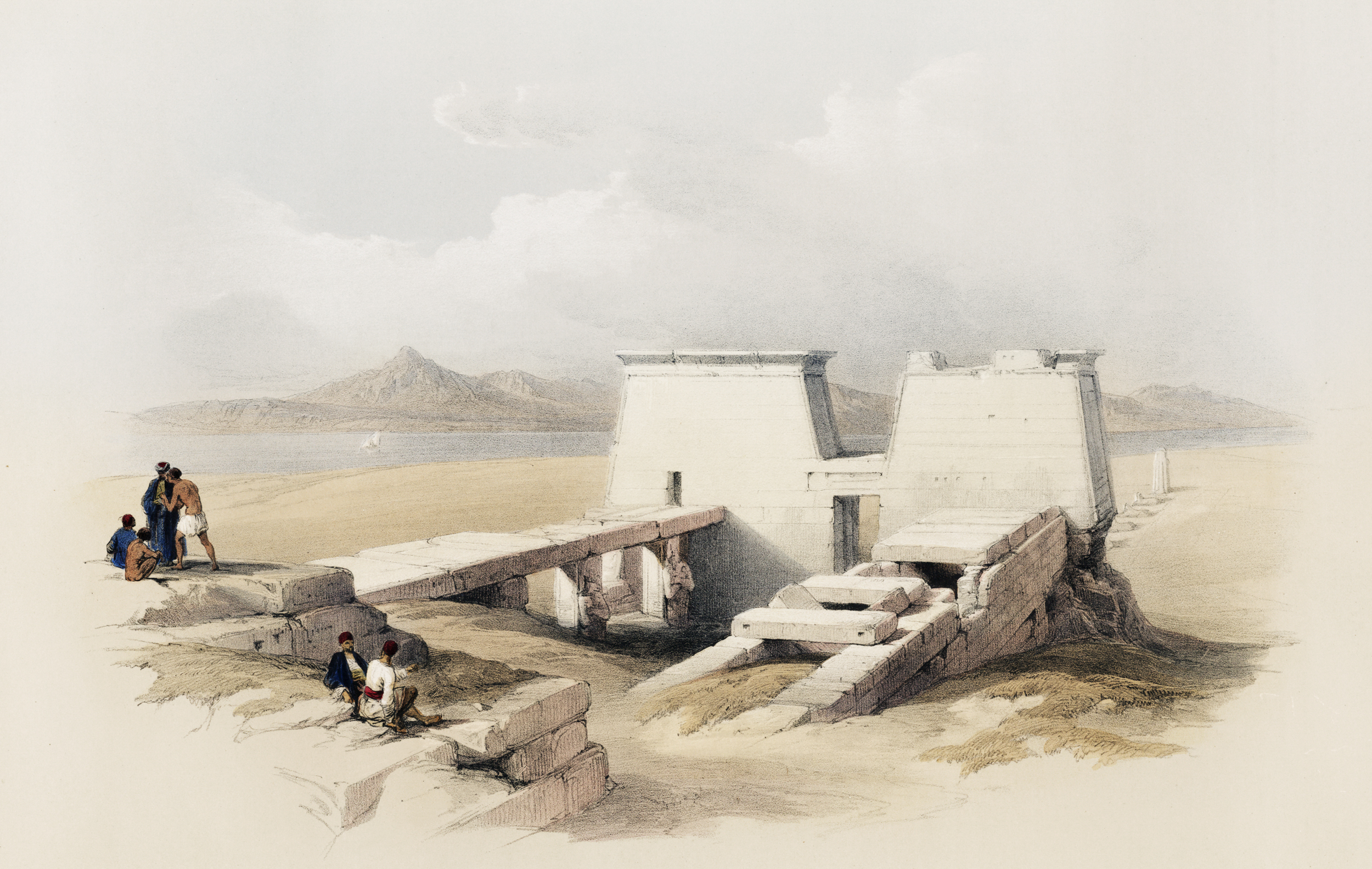
168. Temple of Wady Saboua, Nubia.

=== Volume 5 ===
169. Frontispiece. Front elevation of the Great Temple of Aboo-Simbel.

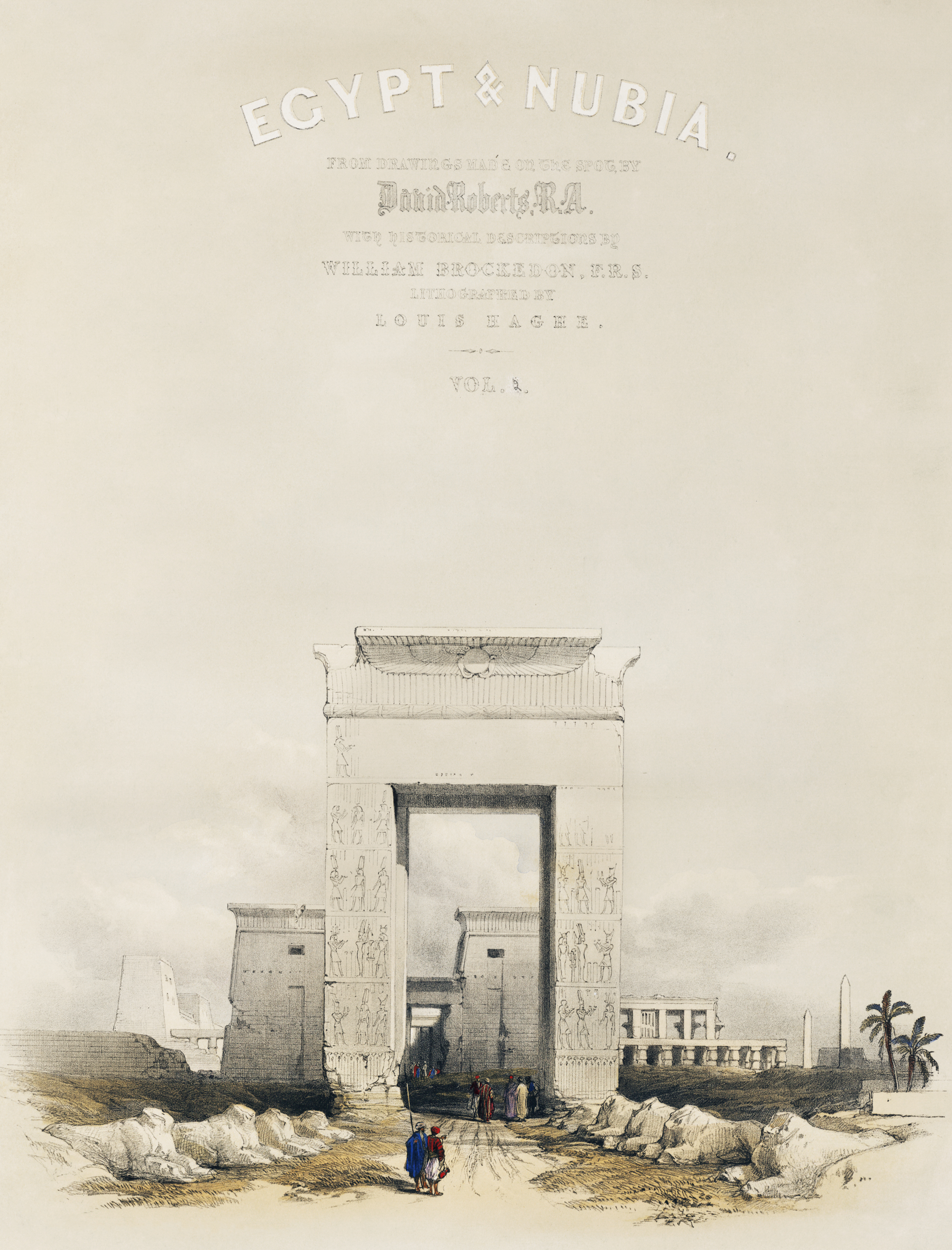
170. Tile page. Great Gateway, leading to the Temple of Karnac, Thebes.

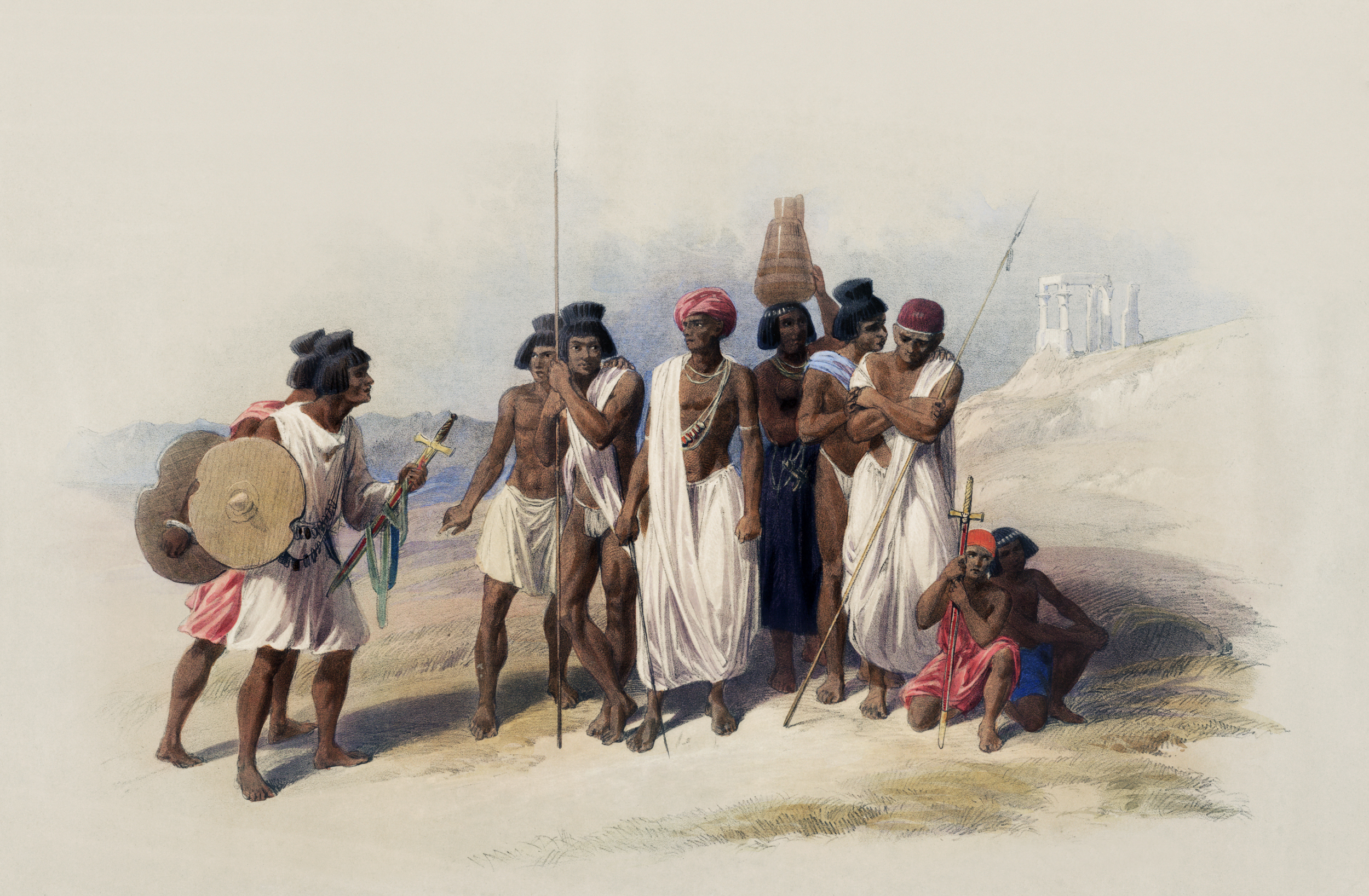
171. Group of Nubians at Wady Kardassy.

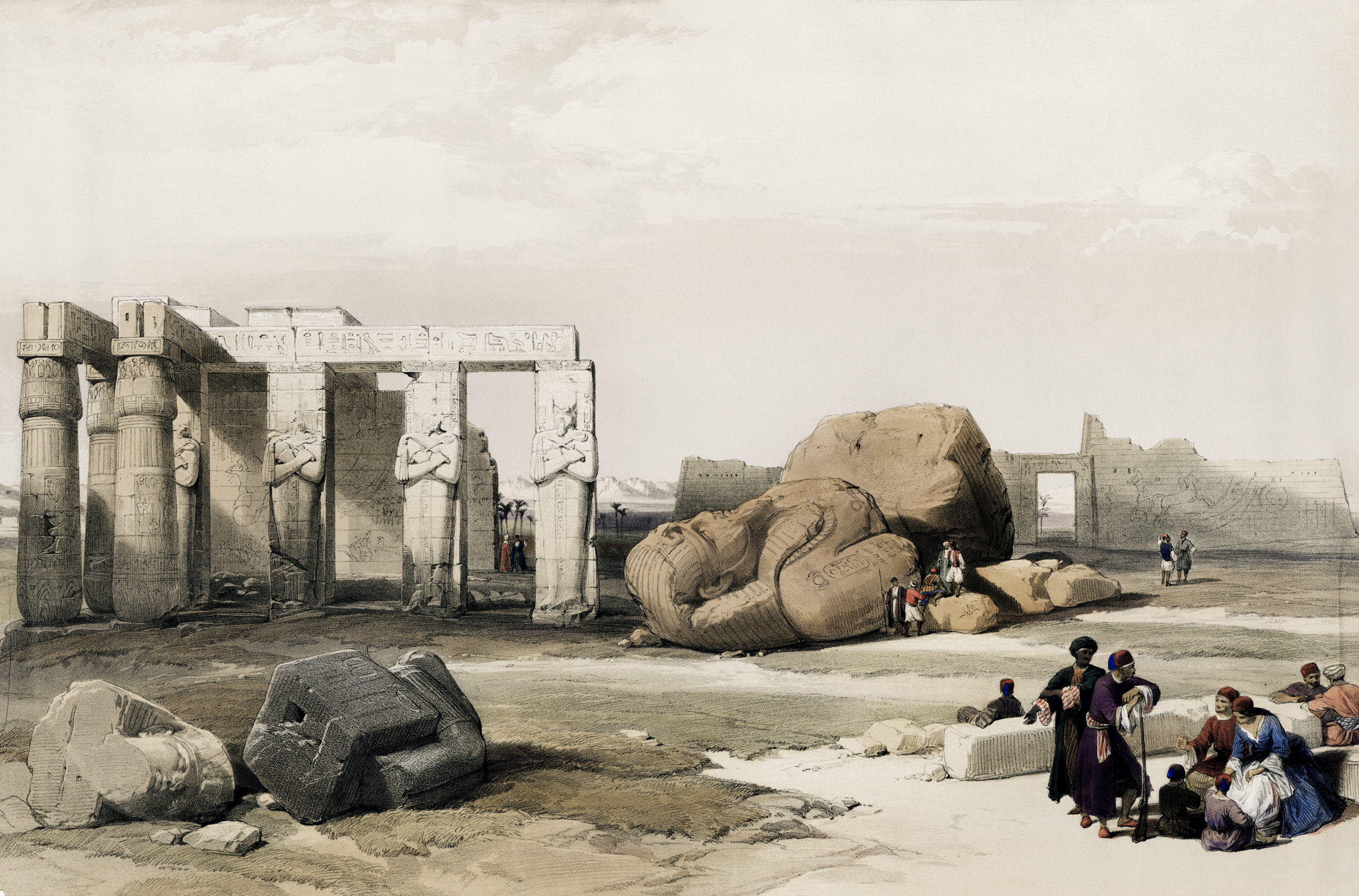
172. Fragment of the Great Colossus at the Memnonium, Thebes.

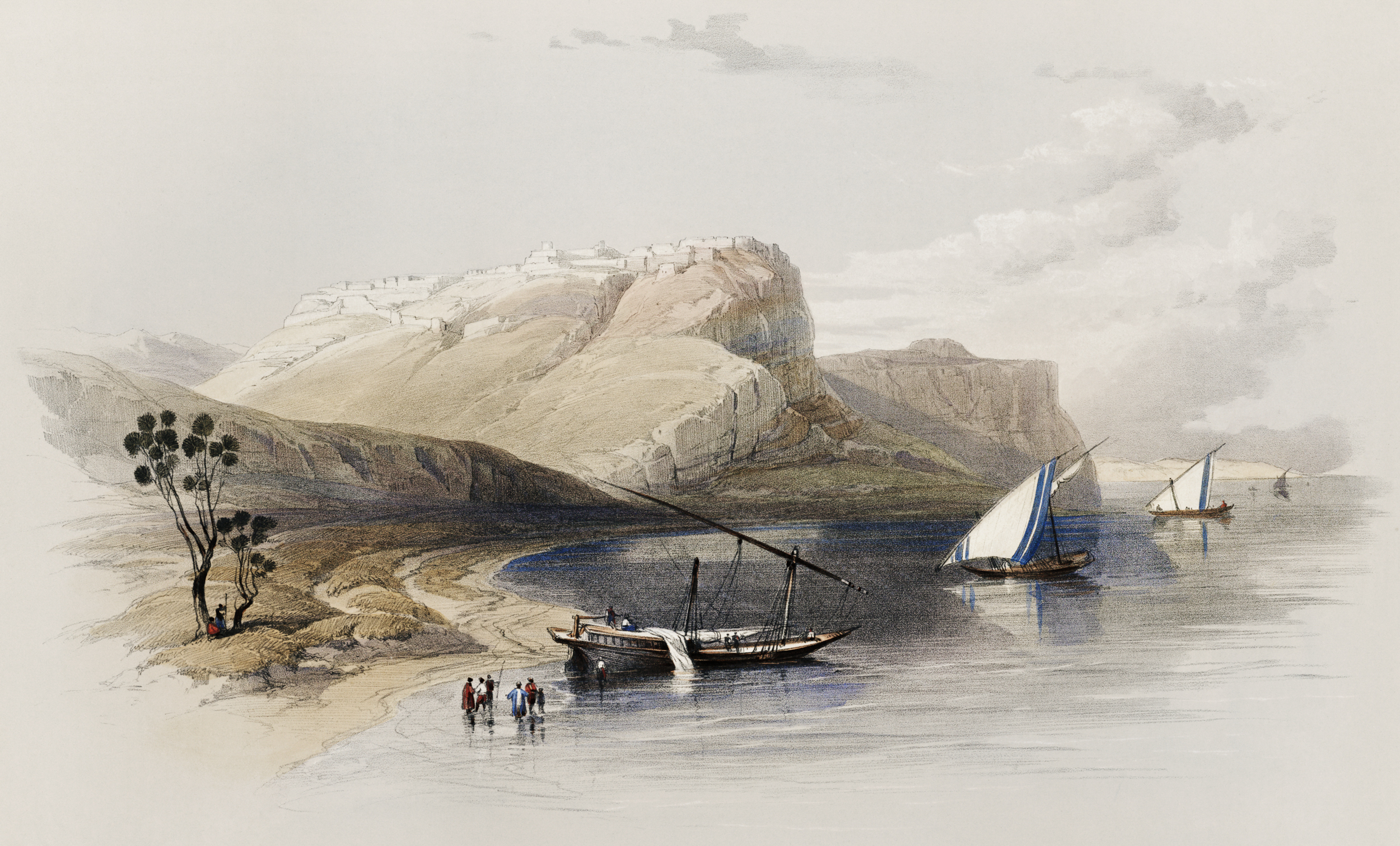
173. Fortress of Ibrim, Nubia.

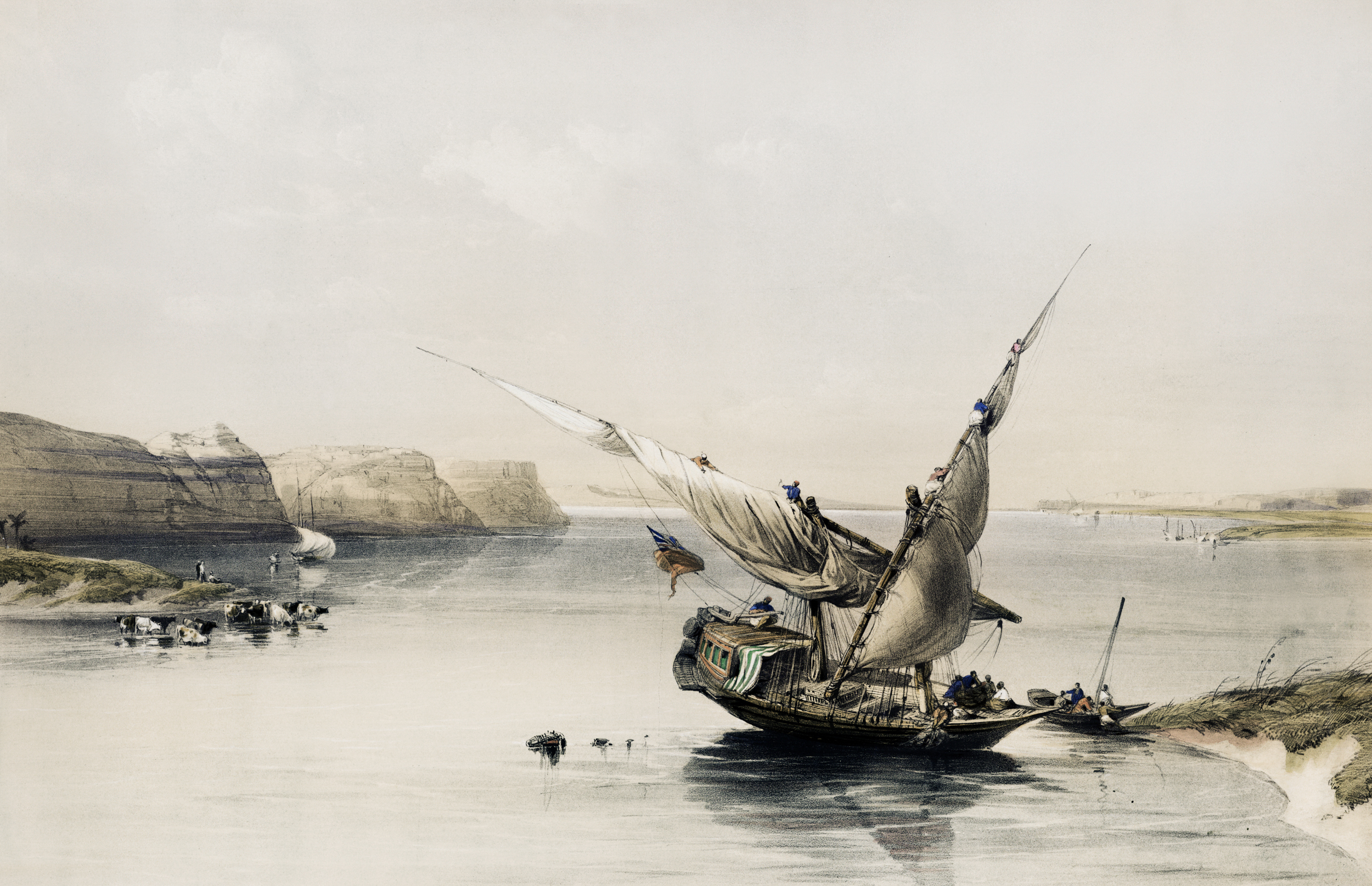
174. Approach to the Fortress of Ibrim.

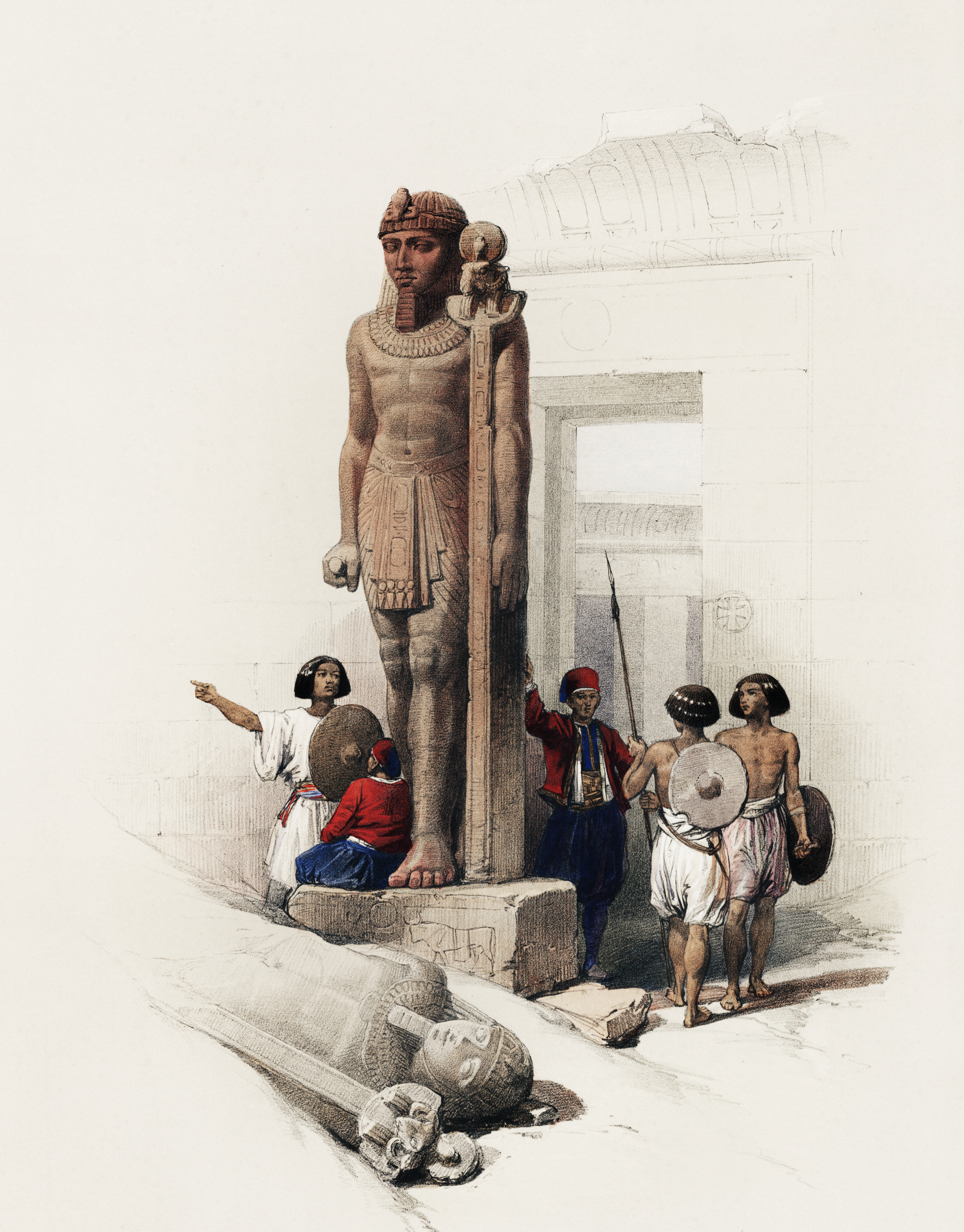
175. Colossi at Wady Saboua.

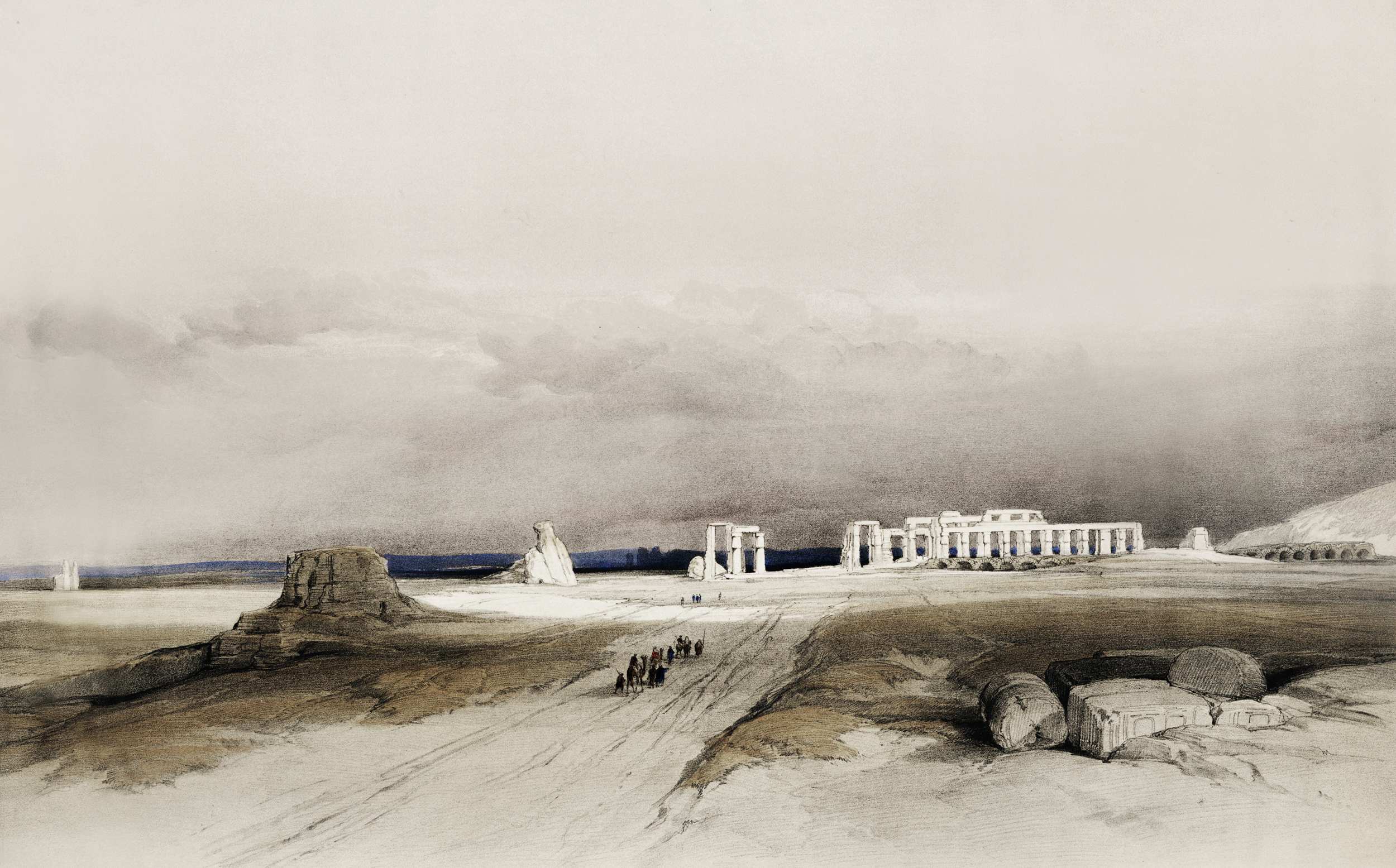
176. Ruins of the Memnonium, Thebes.

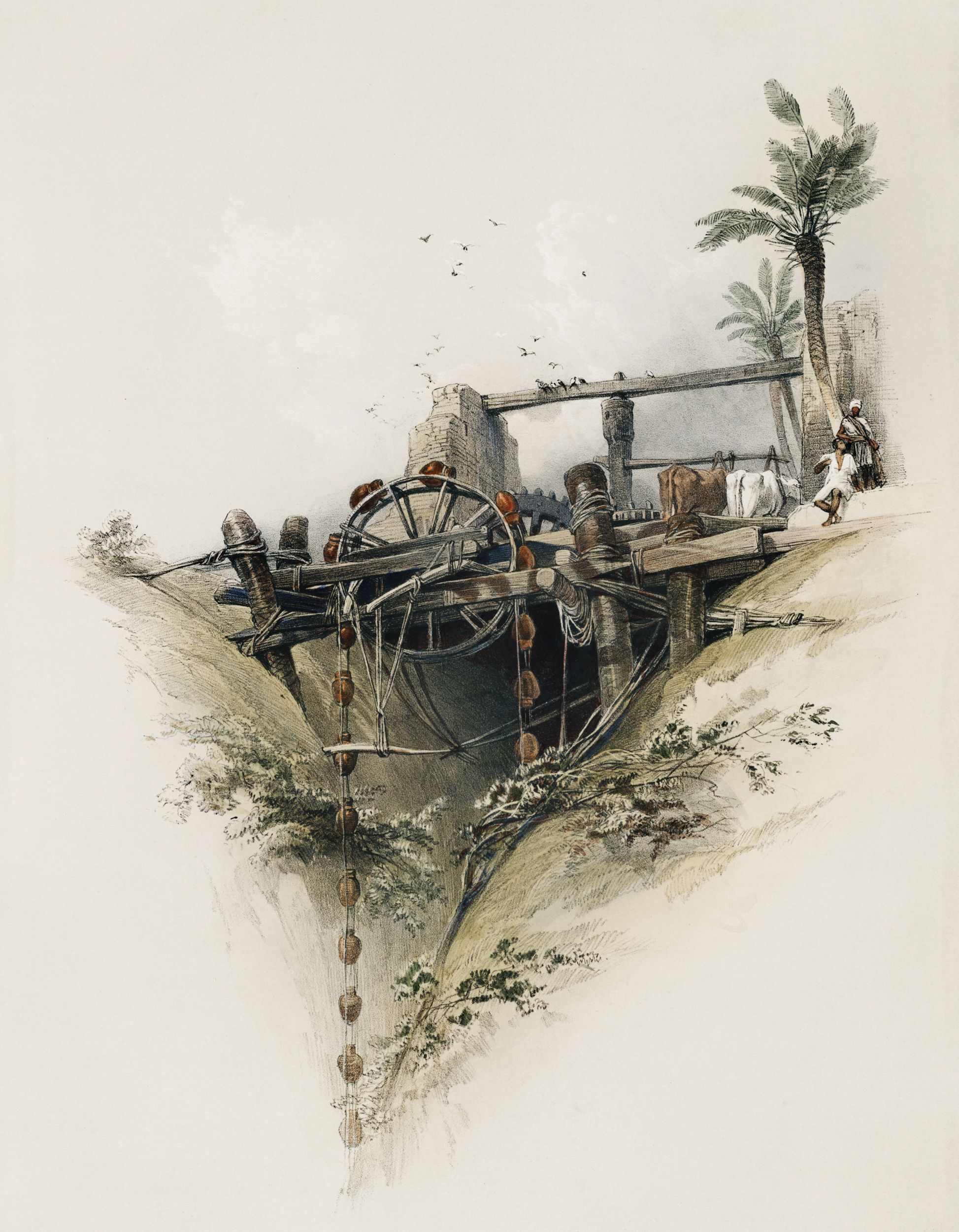
177. Persian Water-Wheel, used for irrigating Nubia.

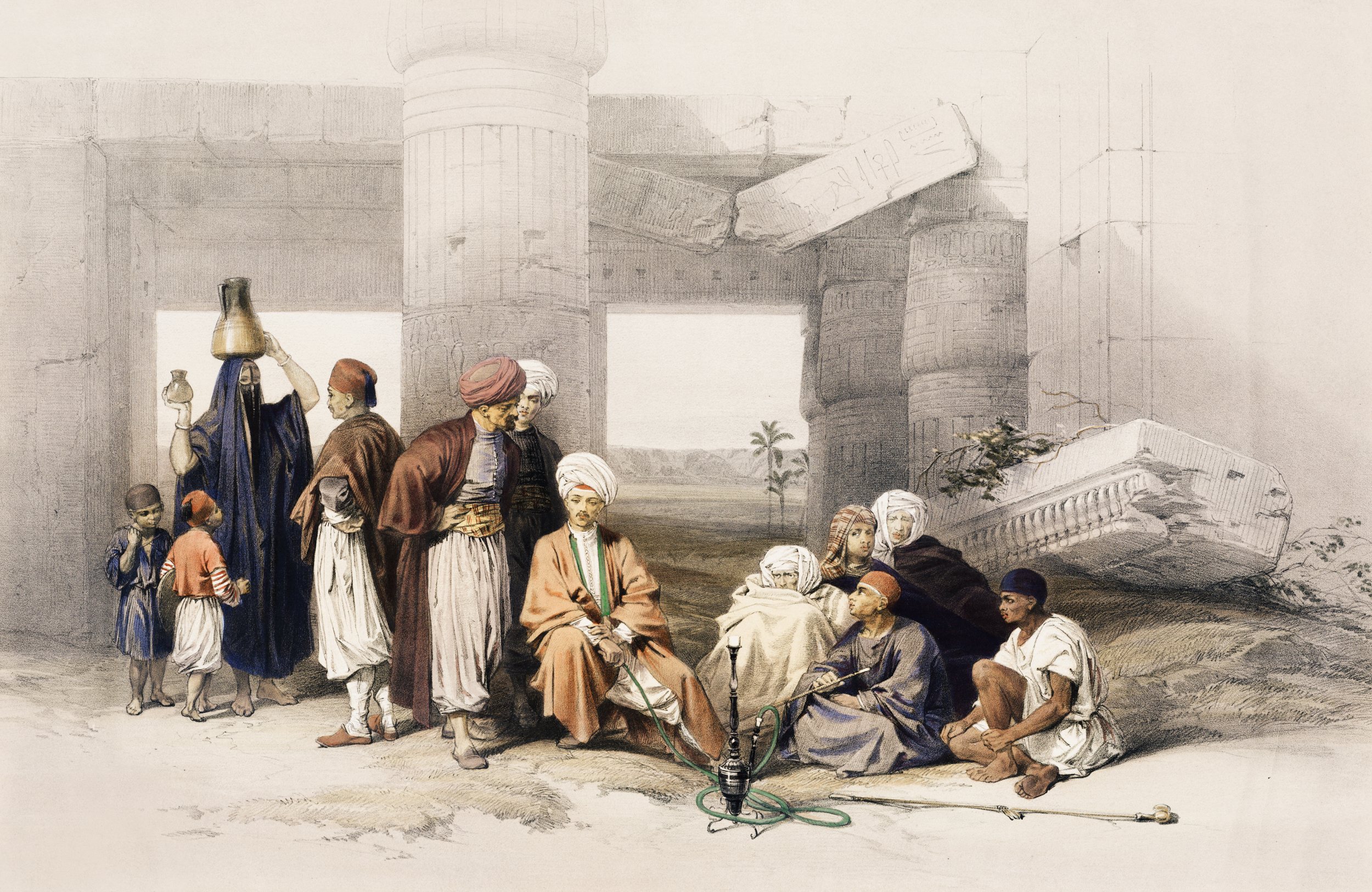
178. A group at the entrance of the Temple of Amun, at Goorna, Thebes.

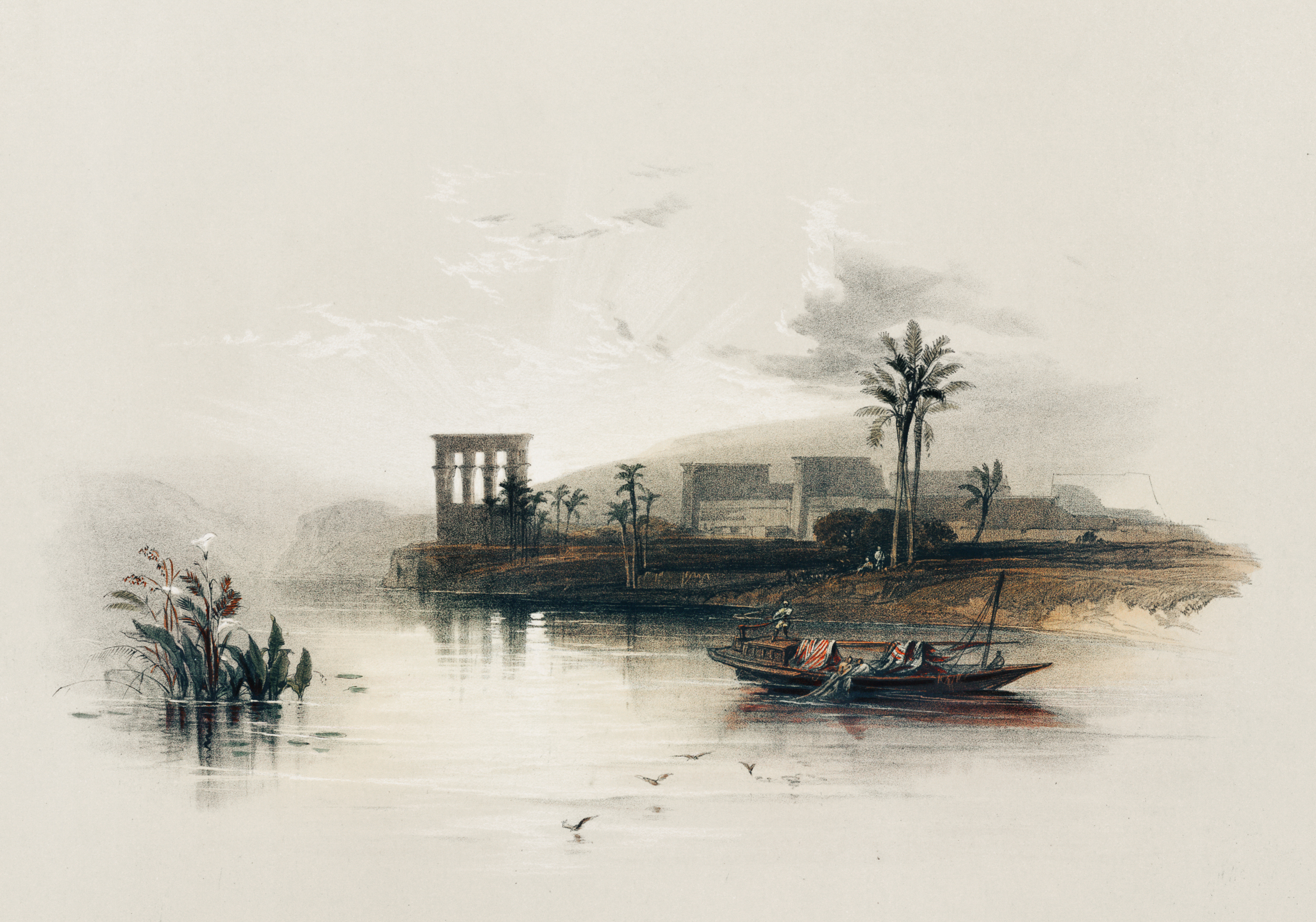
179. The Island of Philoe, by sunset.

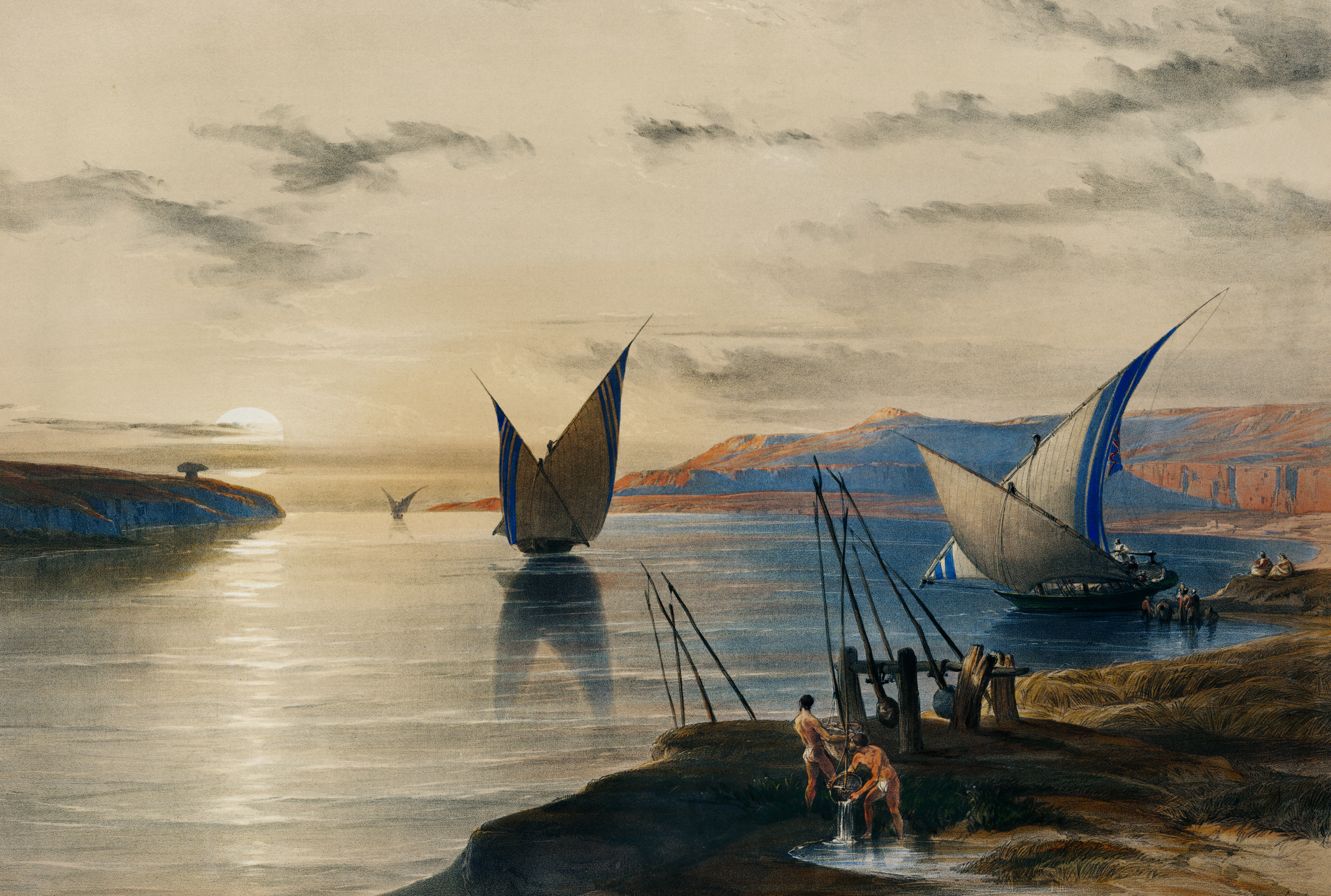
180. Hadjar Silsilis, or the Rock of the Chain.

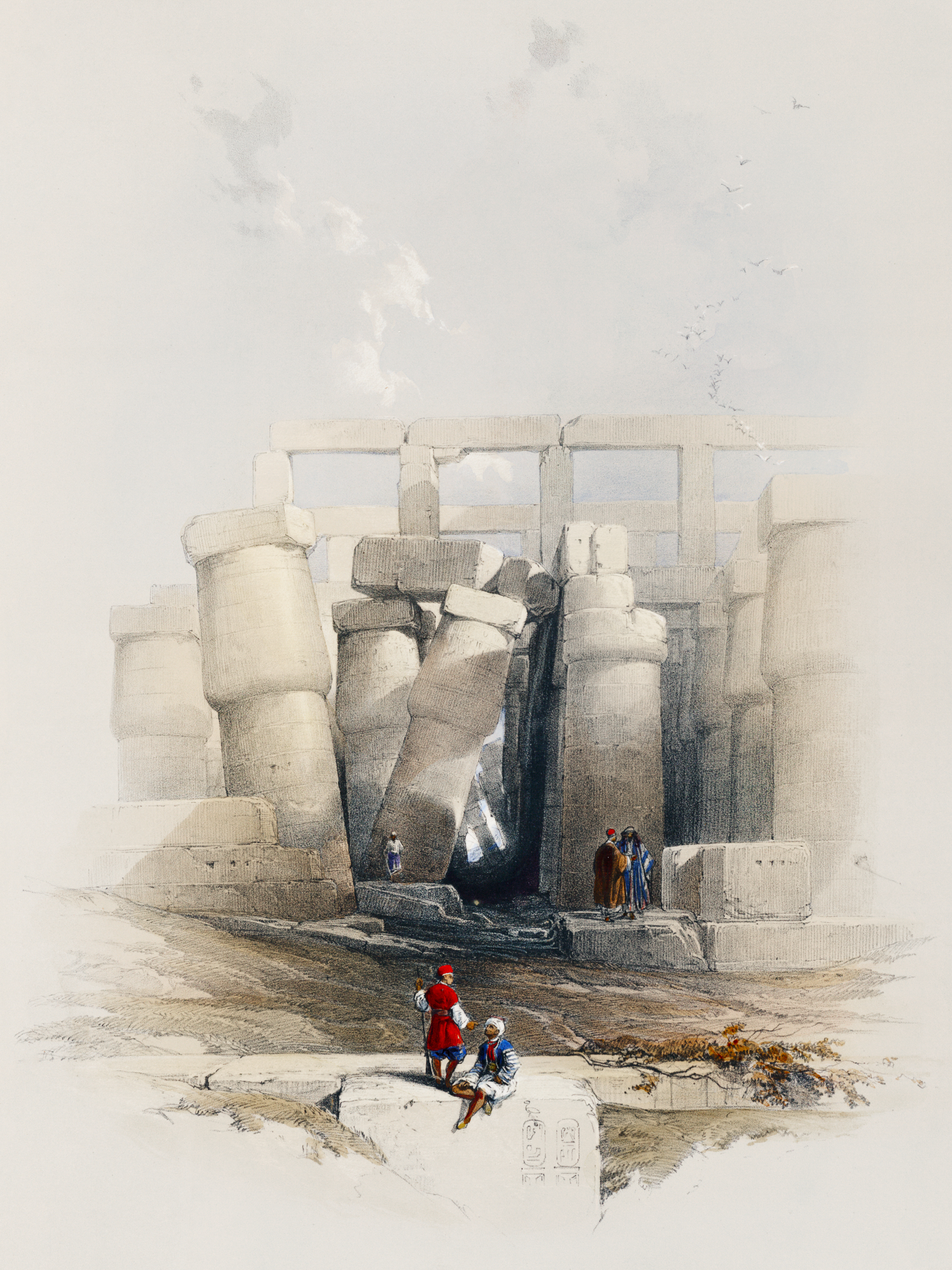
181. Part of the Hall of Columns at Karnac, seen from without.

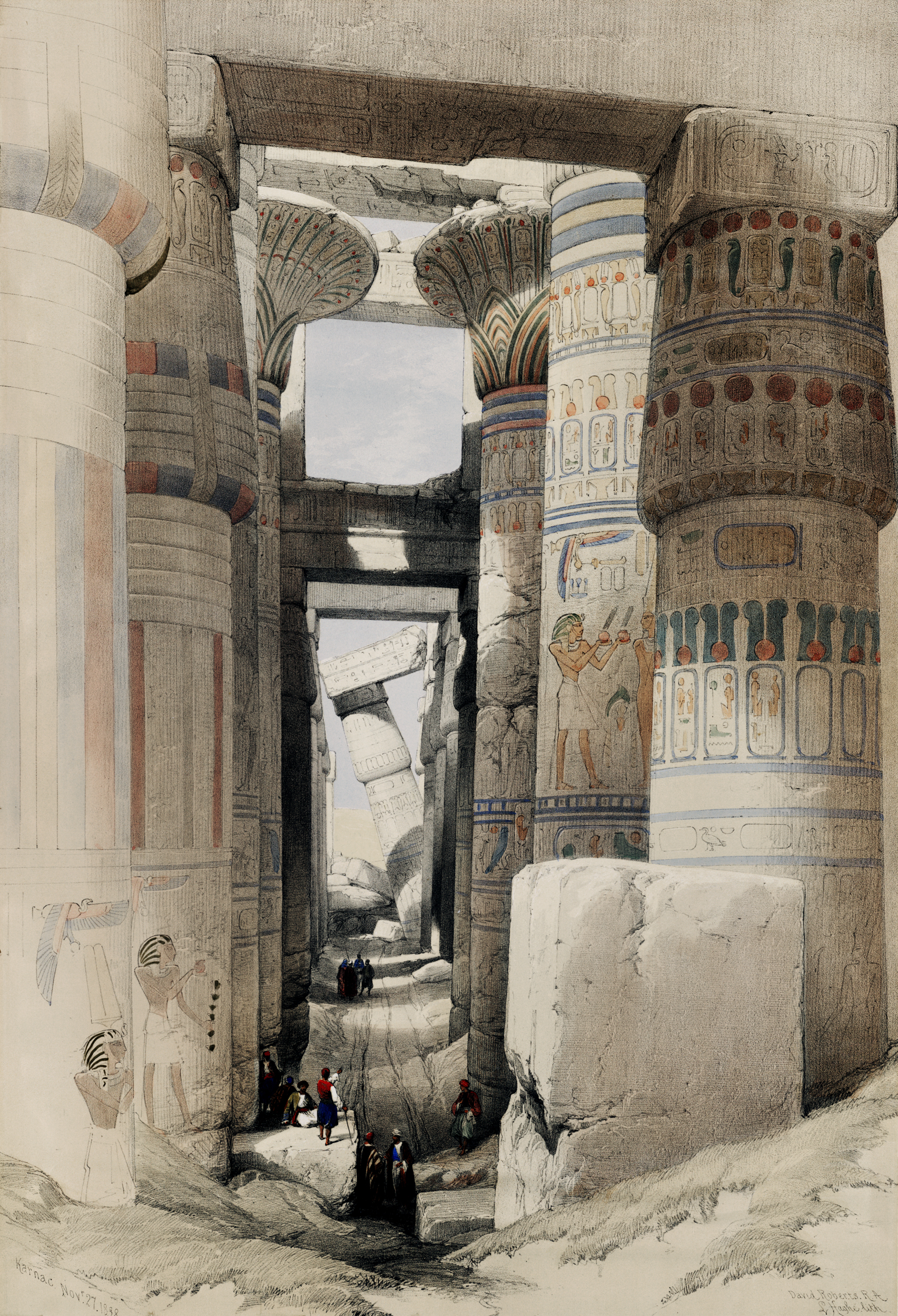
182. View looking across the Hall of Columns, Karnac.

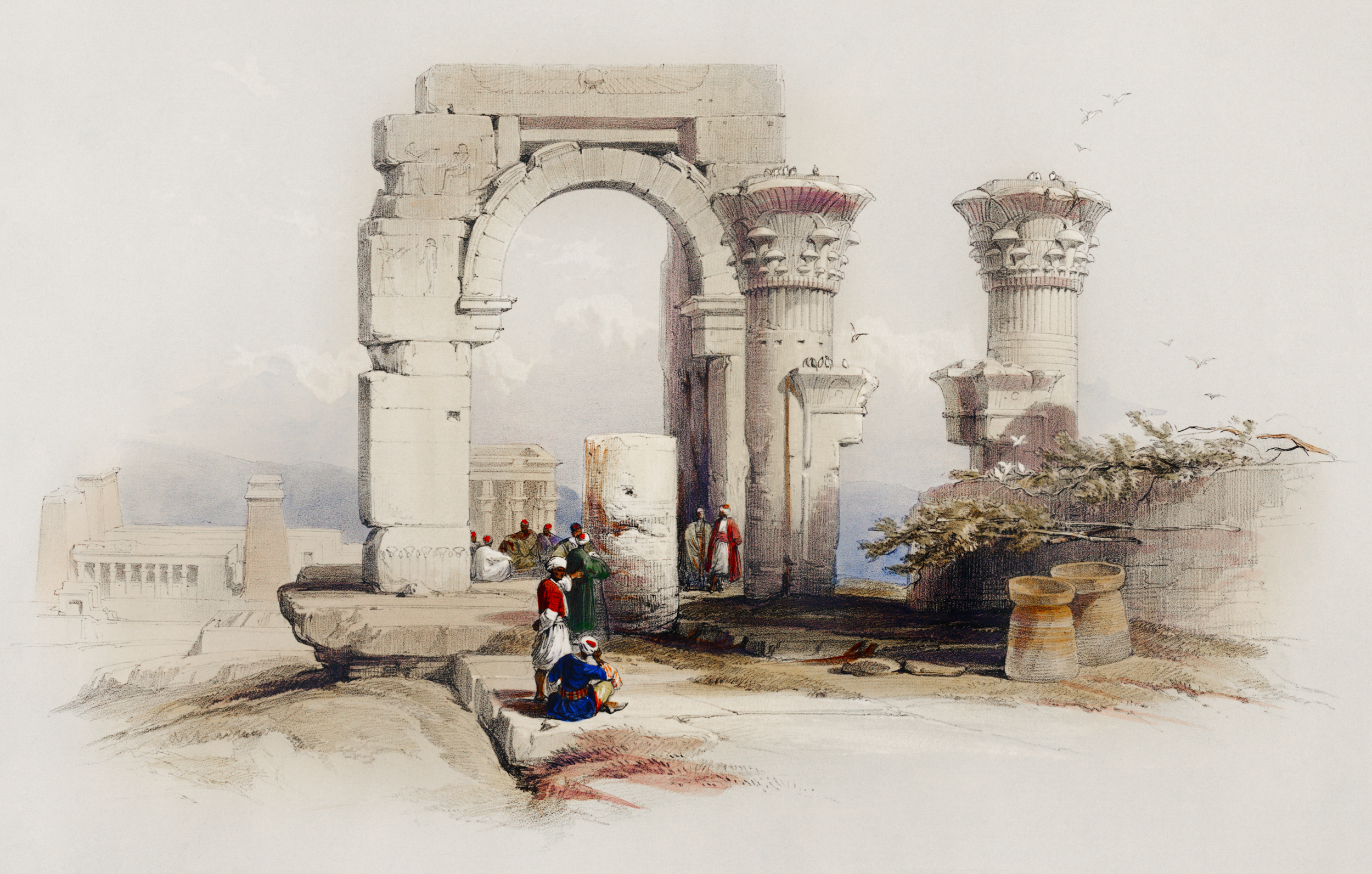
183. Part of the ruins of a temple on the Island of Bigge, Nubia.

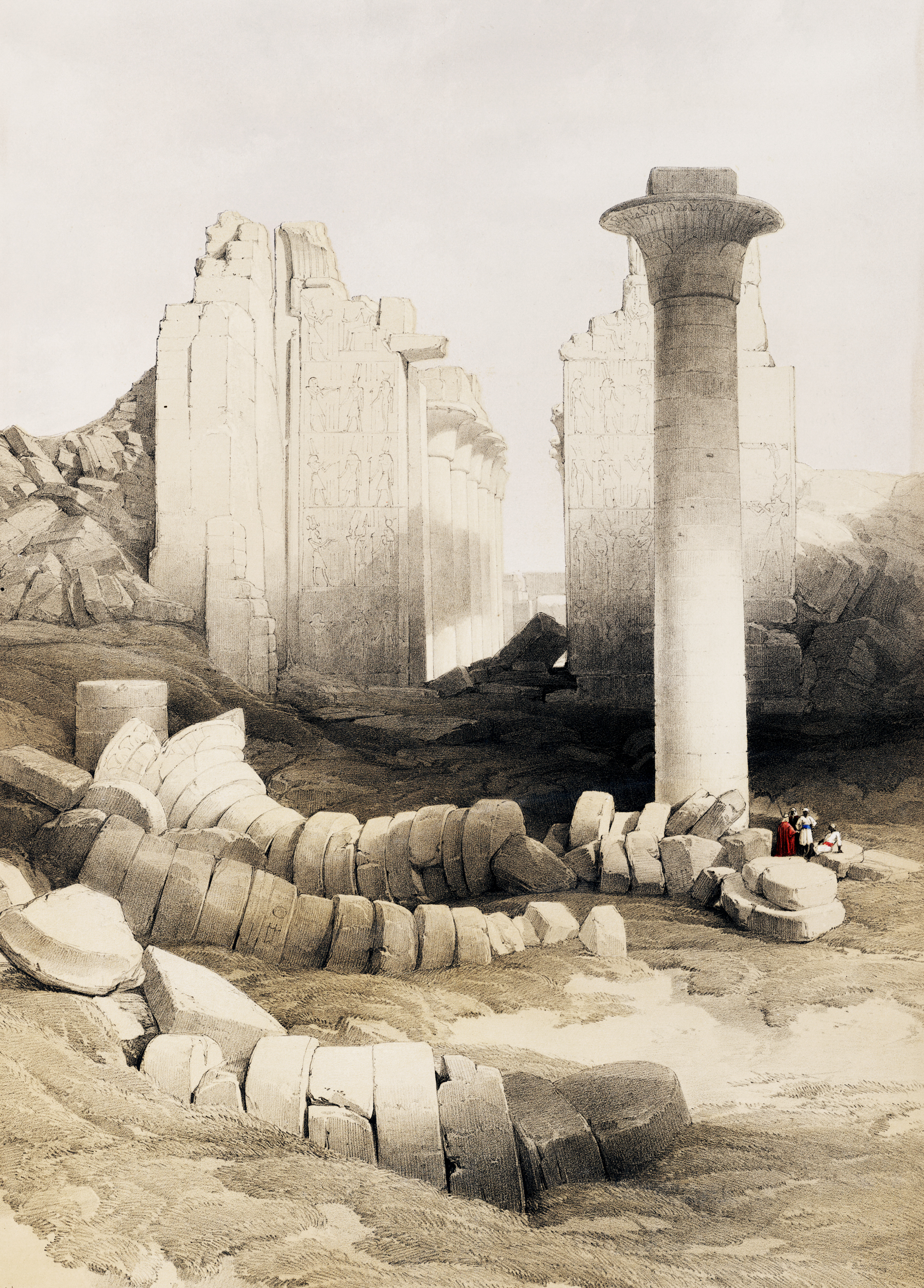
184. The Dromos, or First Court of the Temple of Karnac.

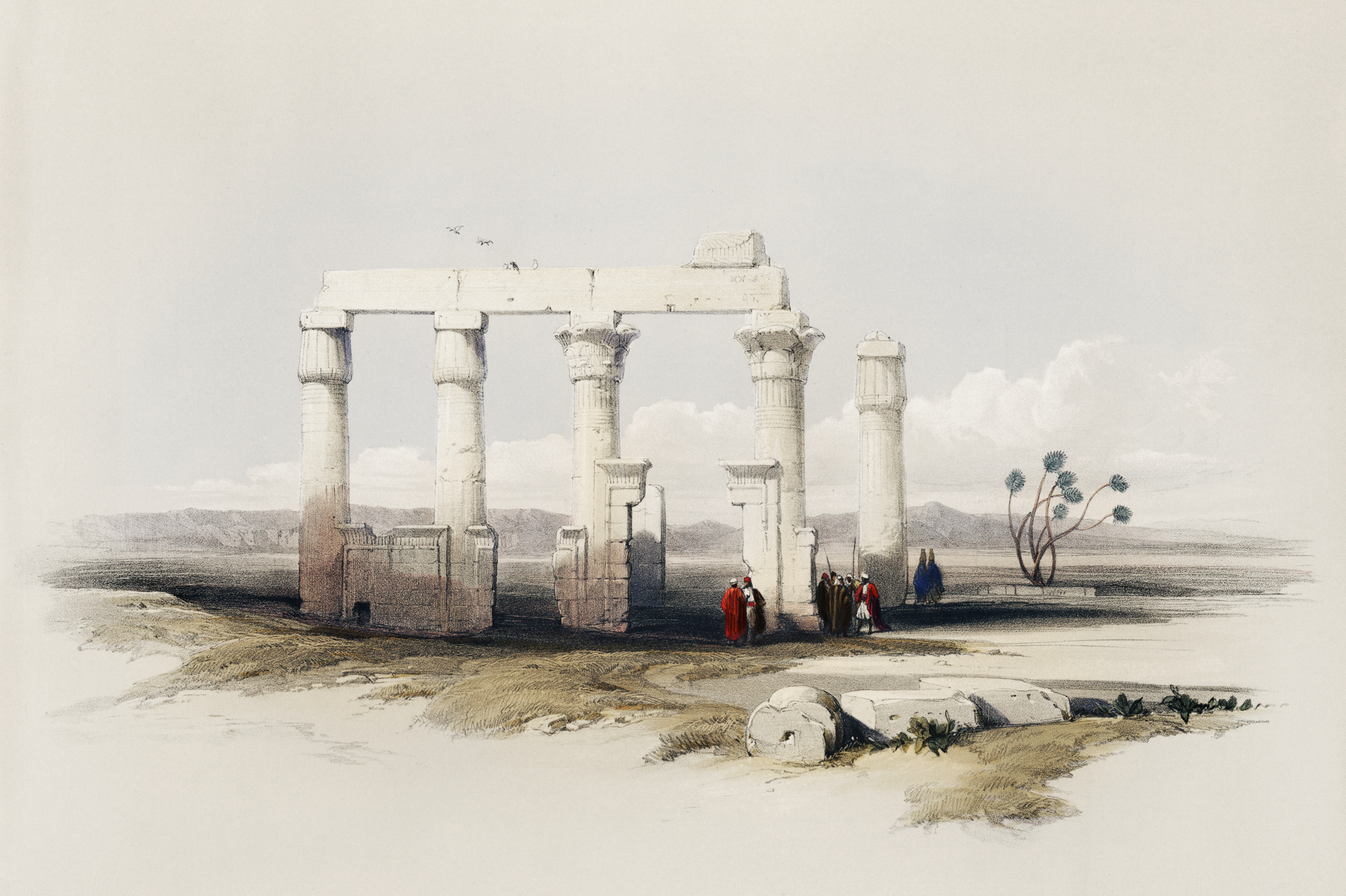
185. Ruins of the Temple of Medamout, near Thebes.

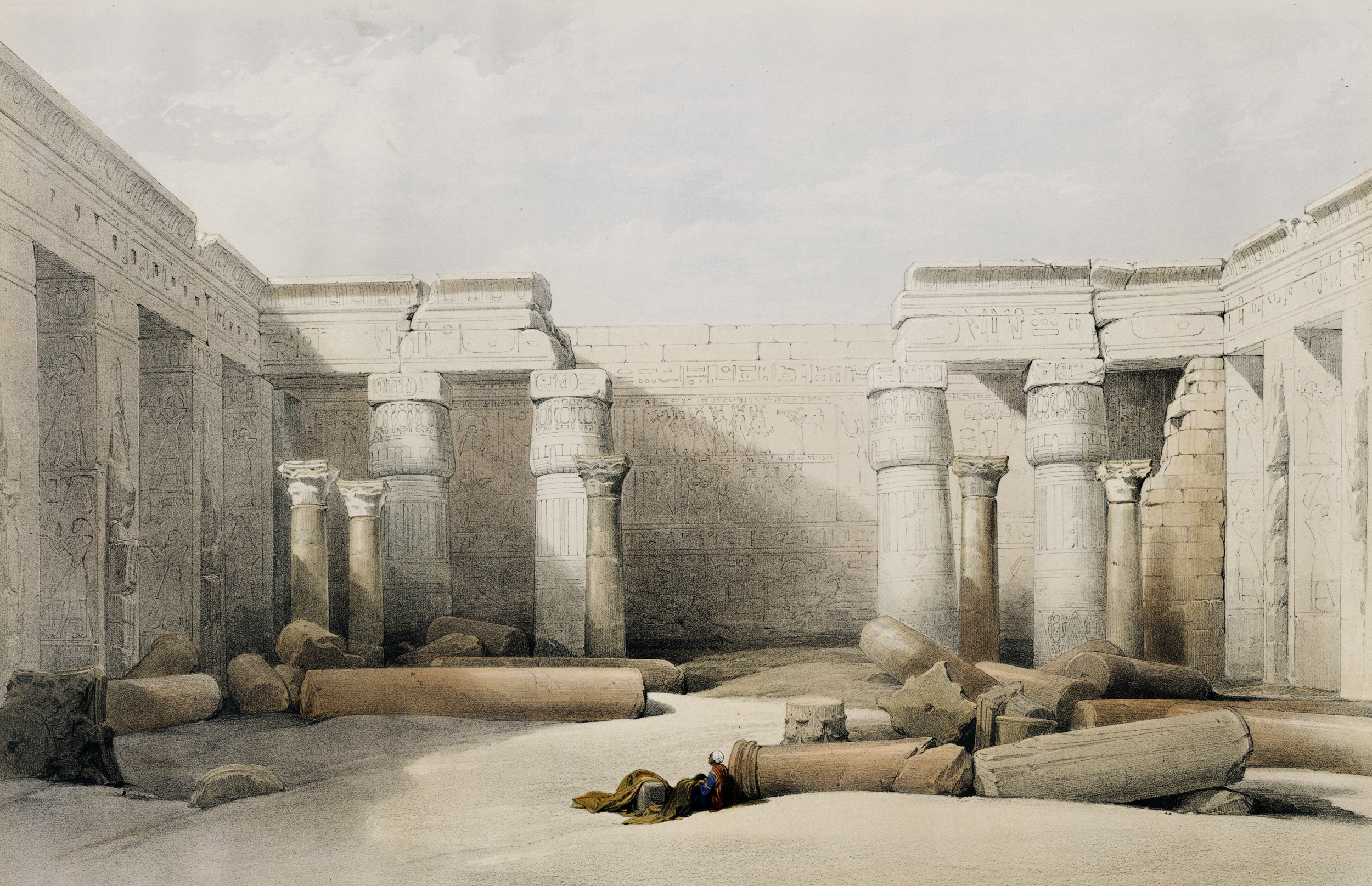
186. Ruins of a Christian Church in the Grand Court of the Temple of Medinet Abou.

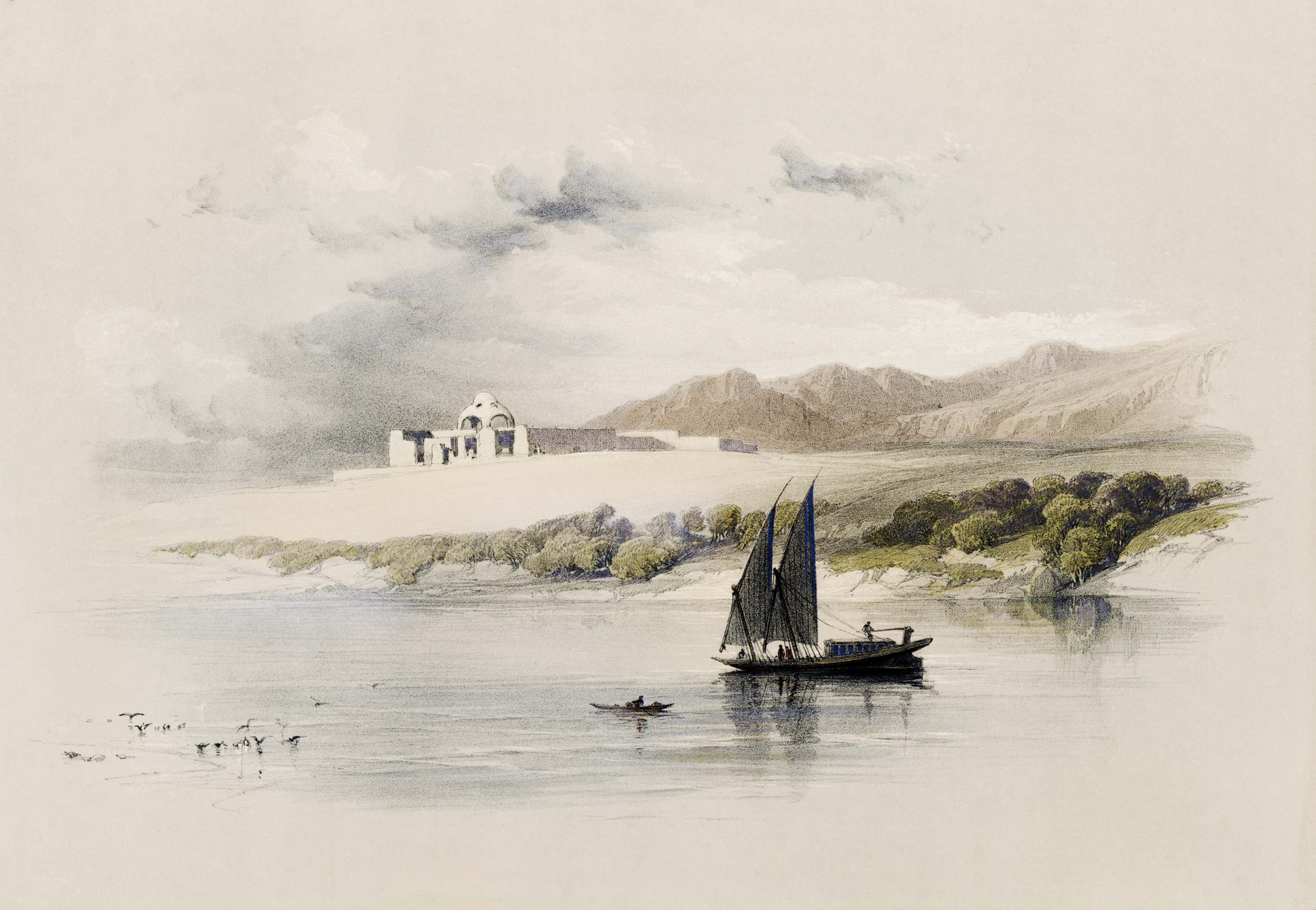
187. Temple of Amada at Hassaia, Nubia.

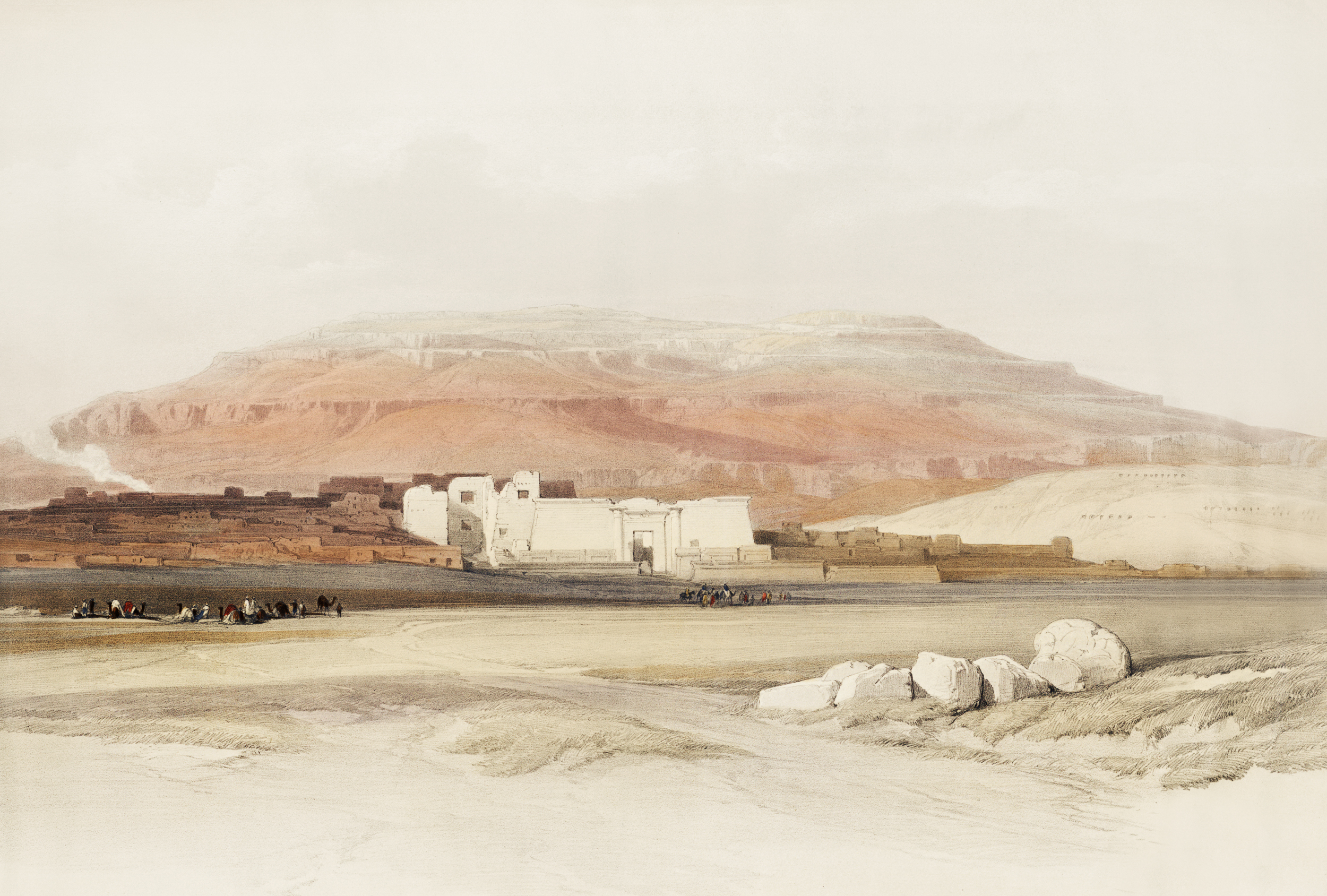
188. Medinet Abou, Thebes.

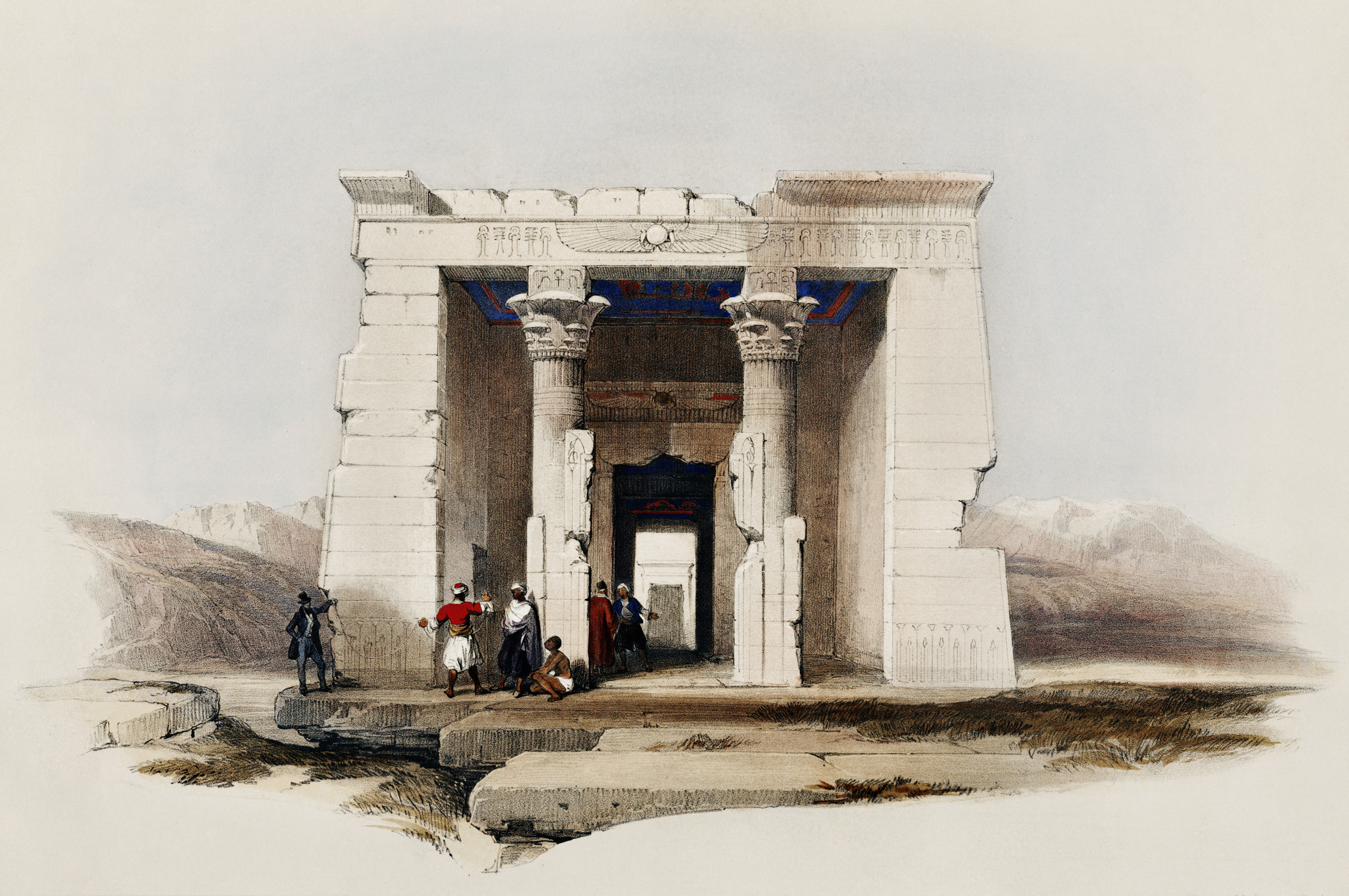
189. Temple of Dandour, Nubia.

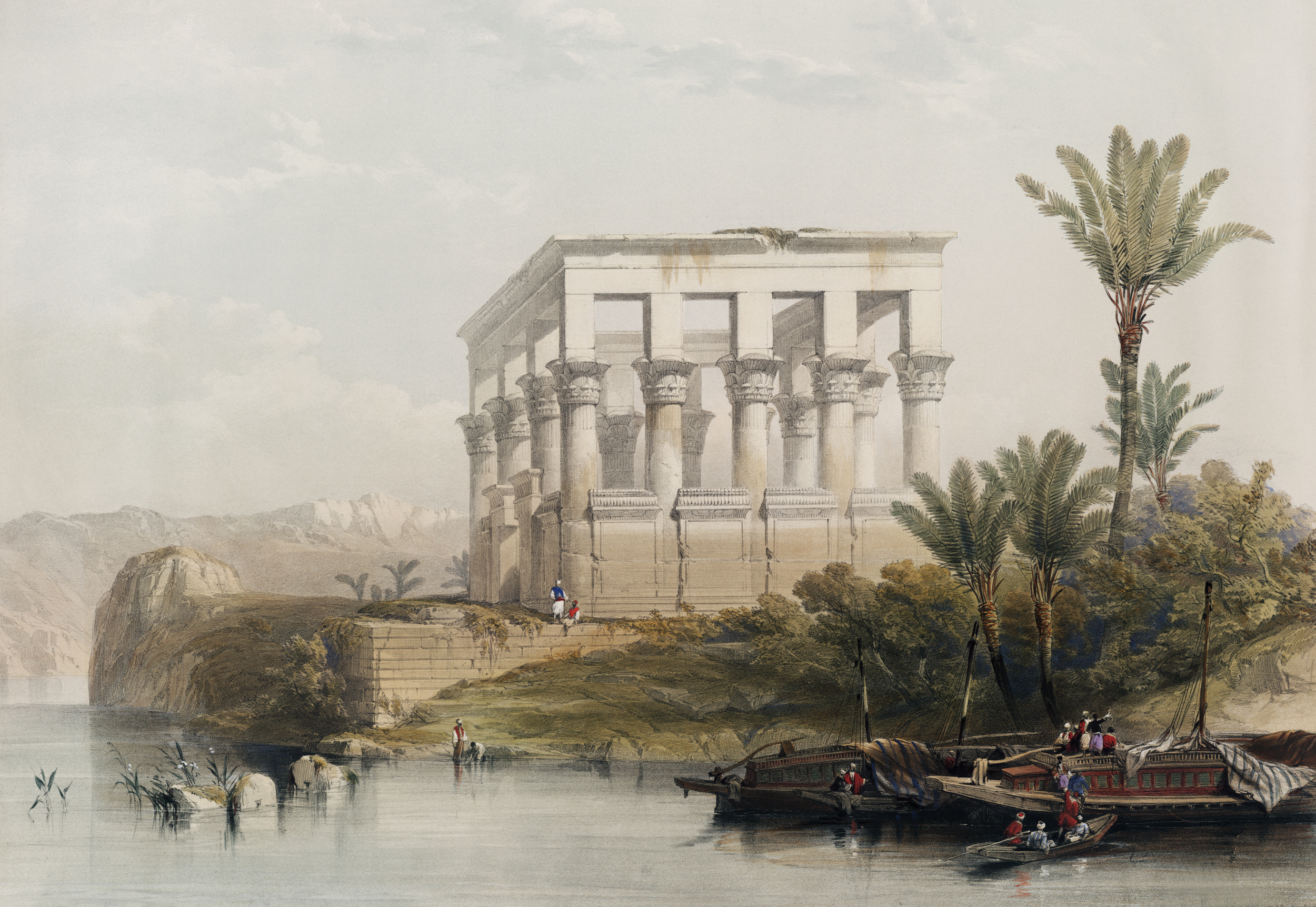
190. The Hypaethral Temple at Philae, called The Bed of Pharaoh.

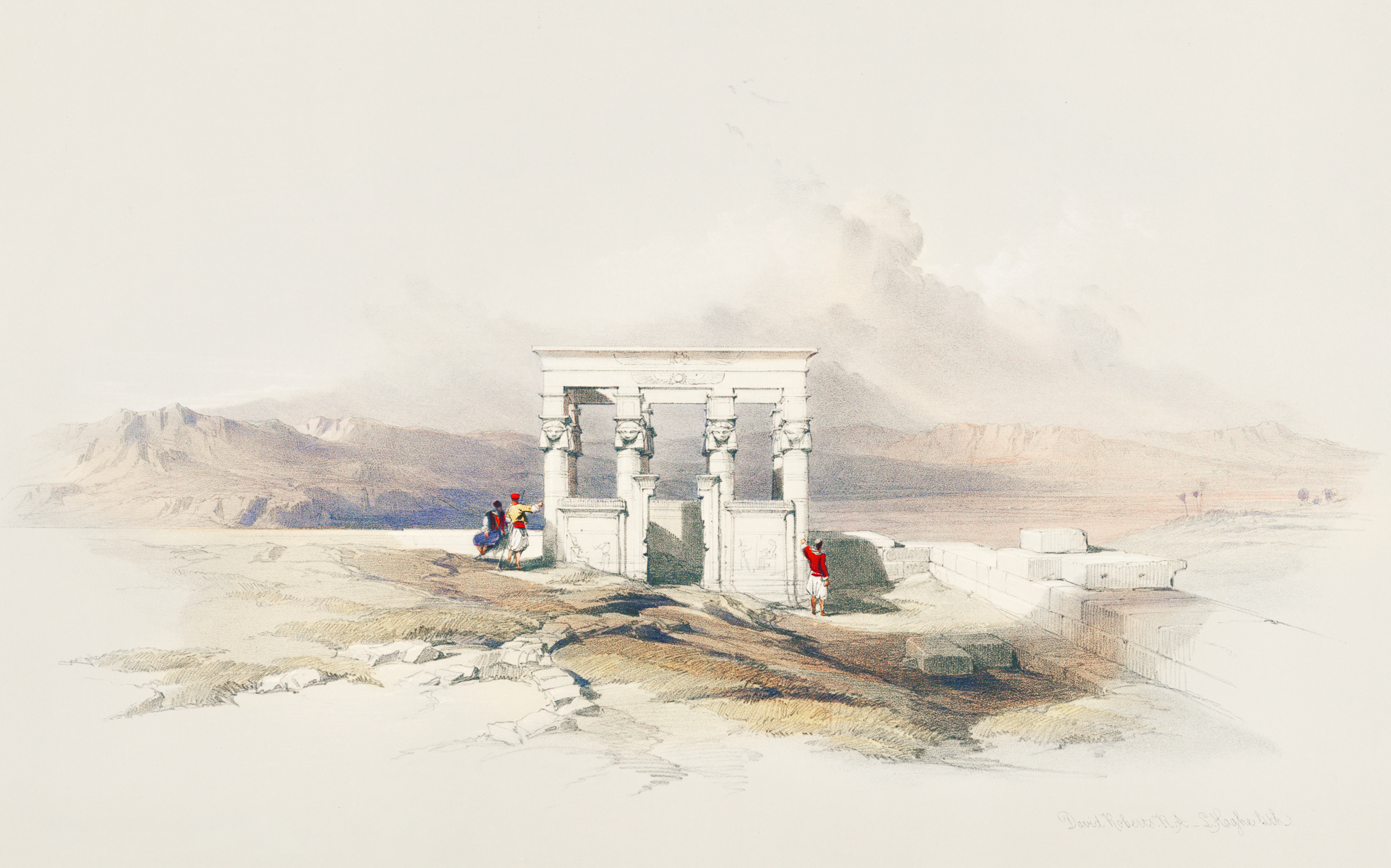
191. Temple of Isis, on the roof of the Great Temple of Dendera.

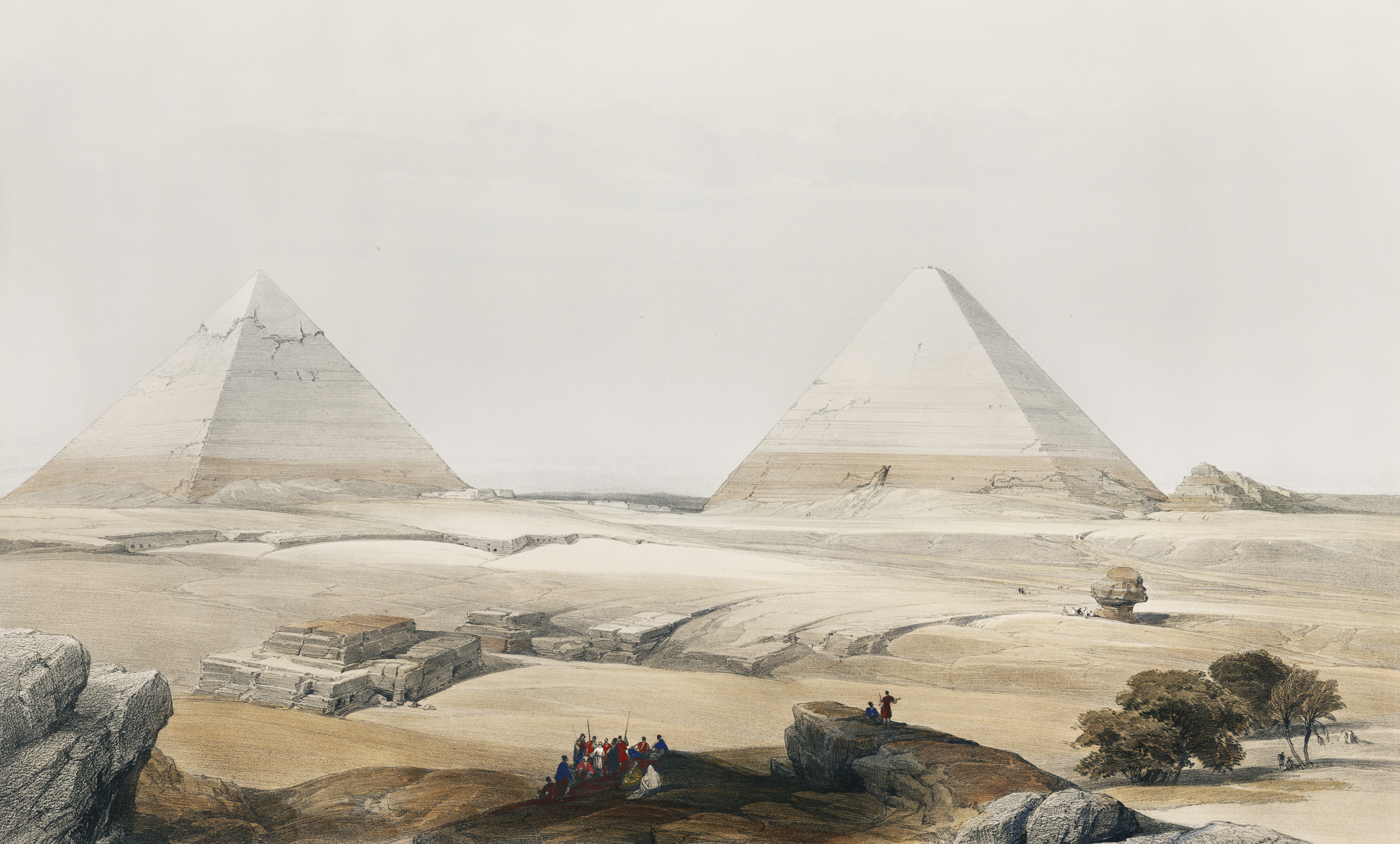
192. Pyramids of Geezah.

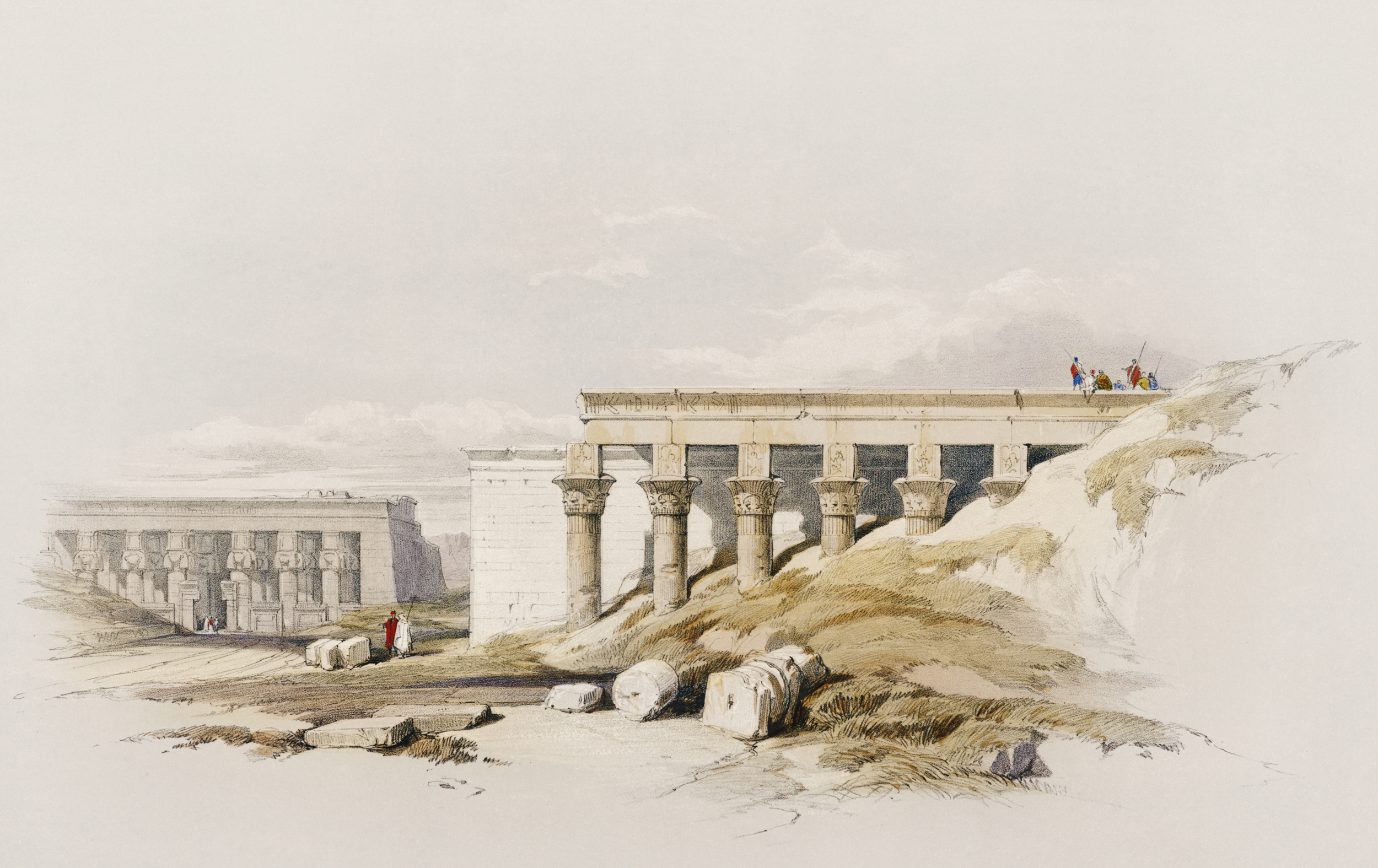
193. Lateral view of the Typhonaeum at Dendera.

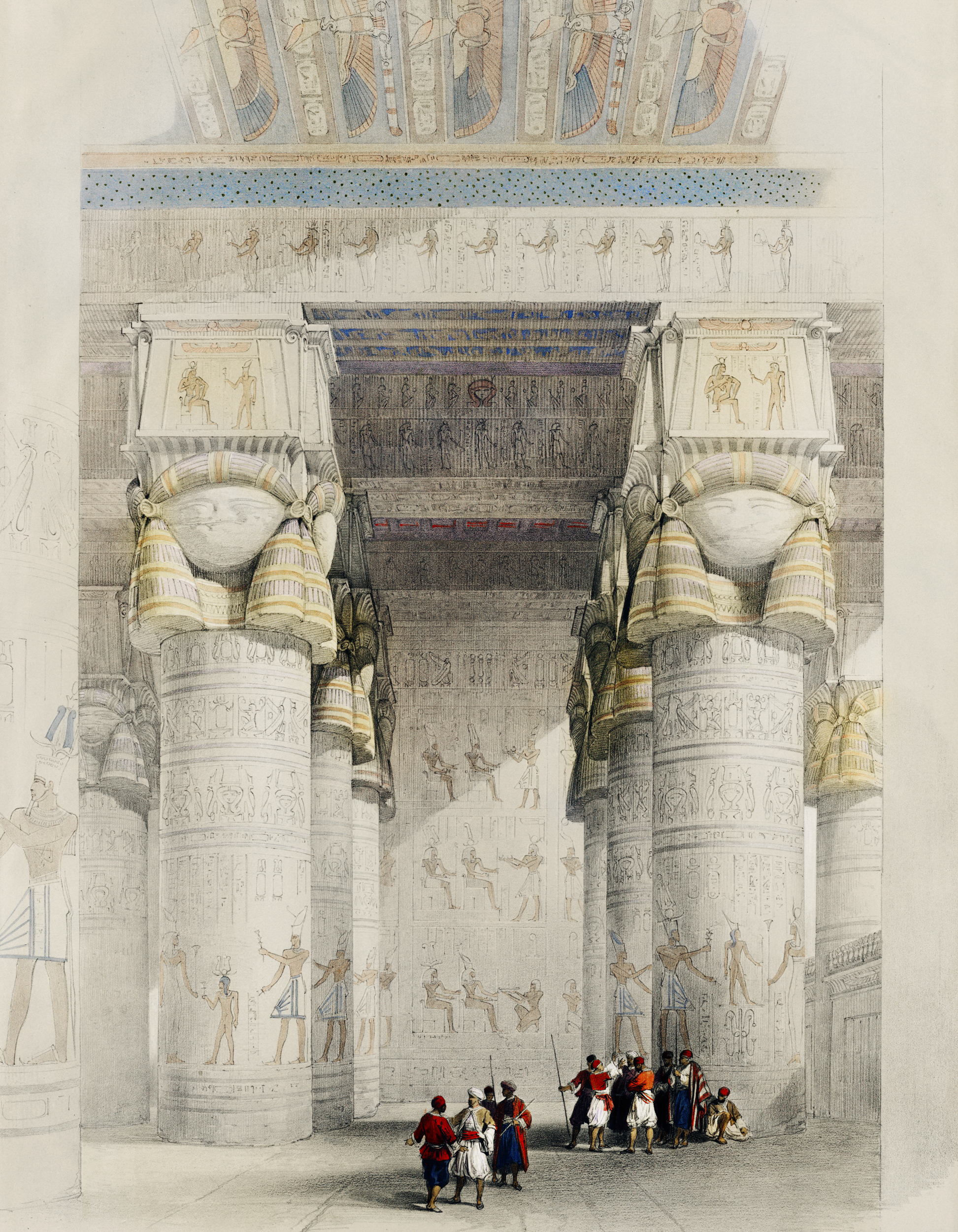
194. View from under the Portico of the Temple of Dendera.

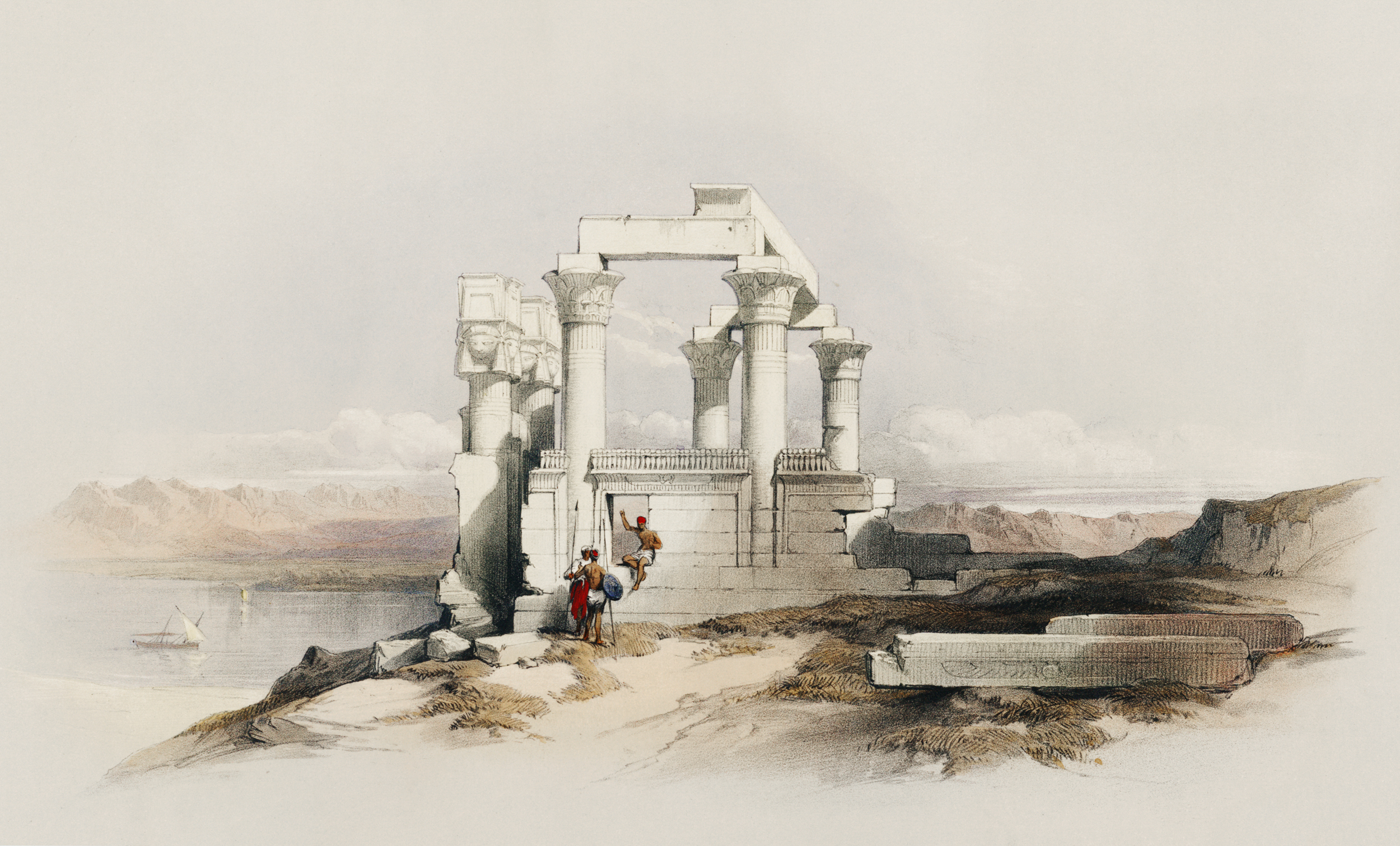
195. Temple of Wady Kardassy, Nubia.

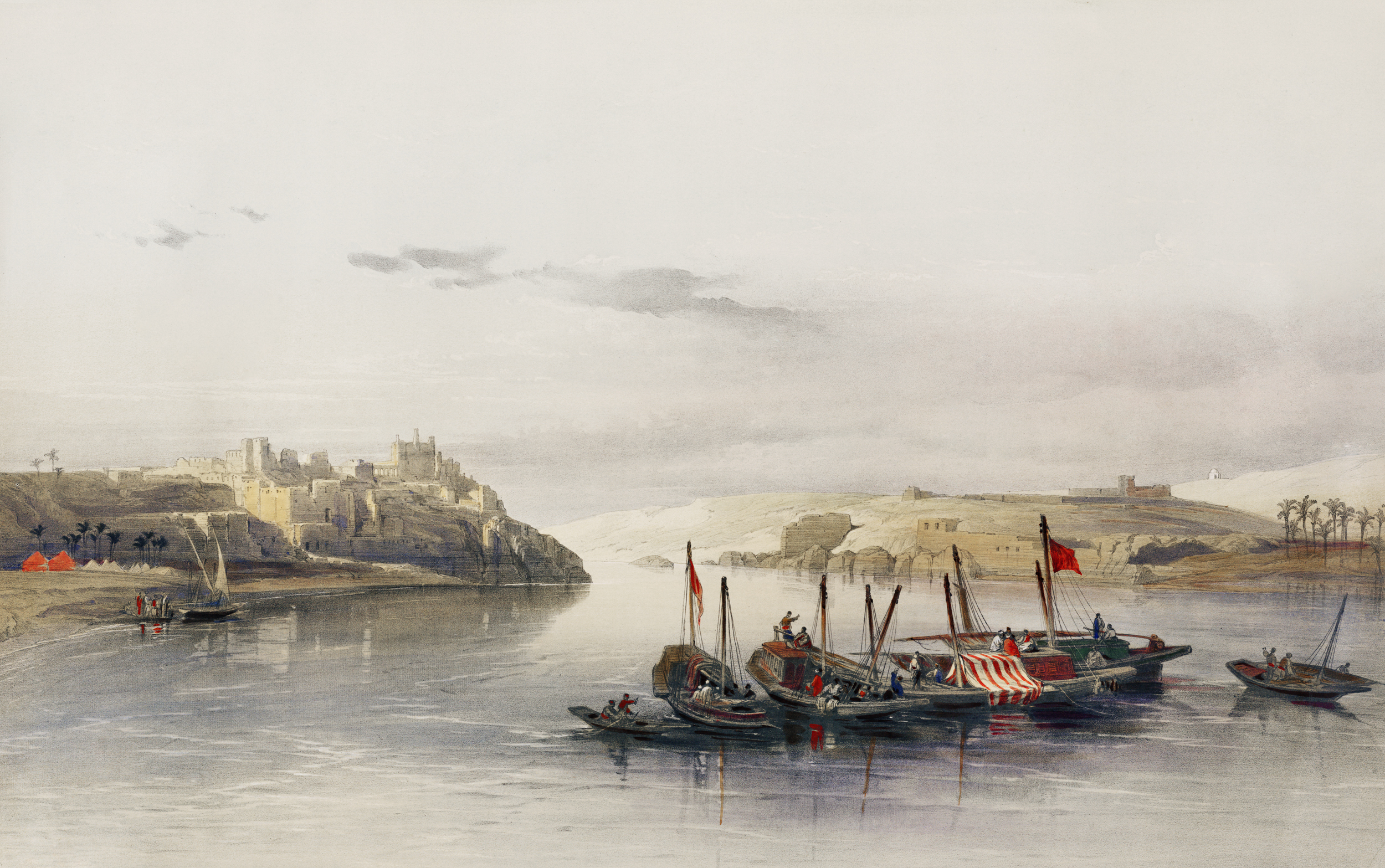
196. Asouan and the Island of Elephantine.

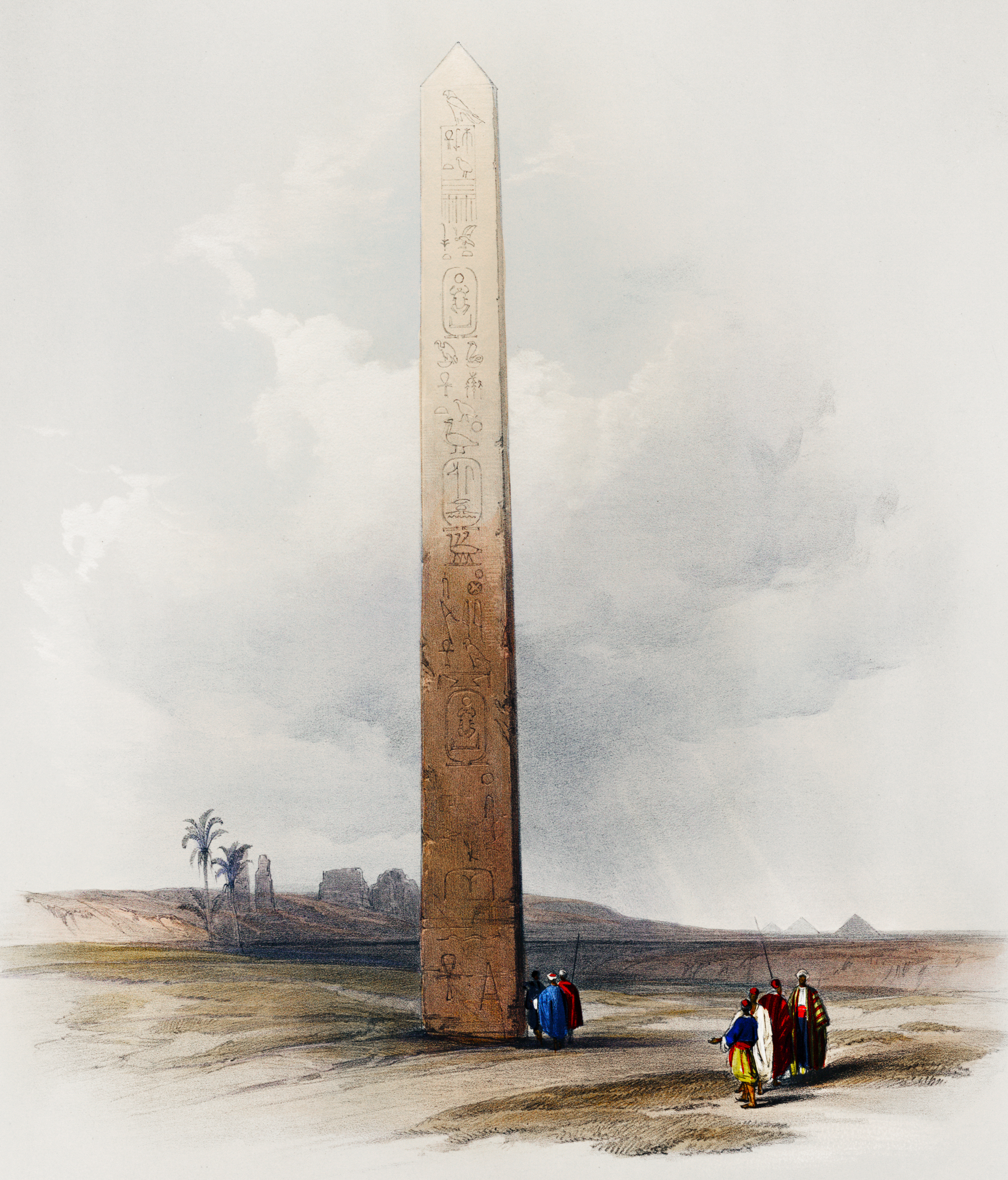
197. Obelisk of On.

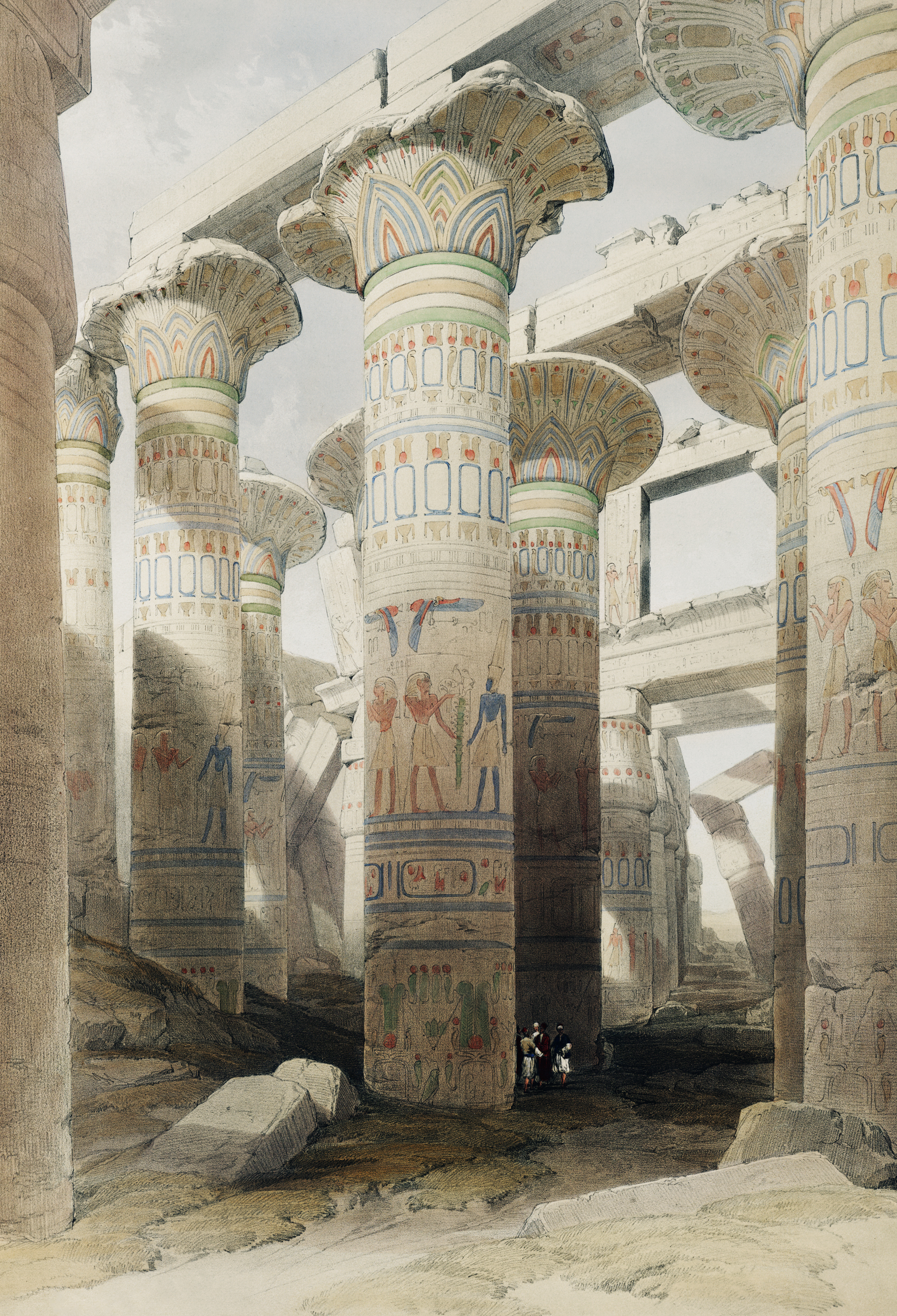
198. Oblique view of the Hall of Columns, Karnac.

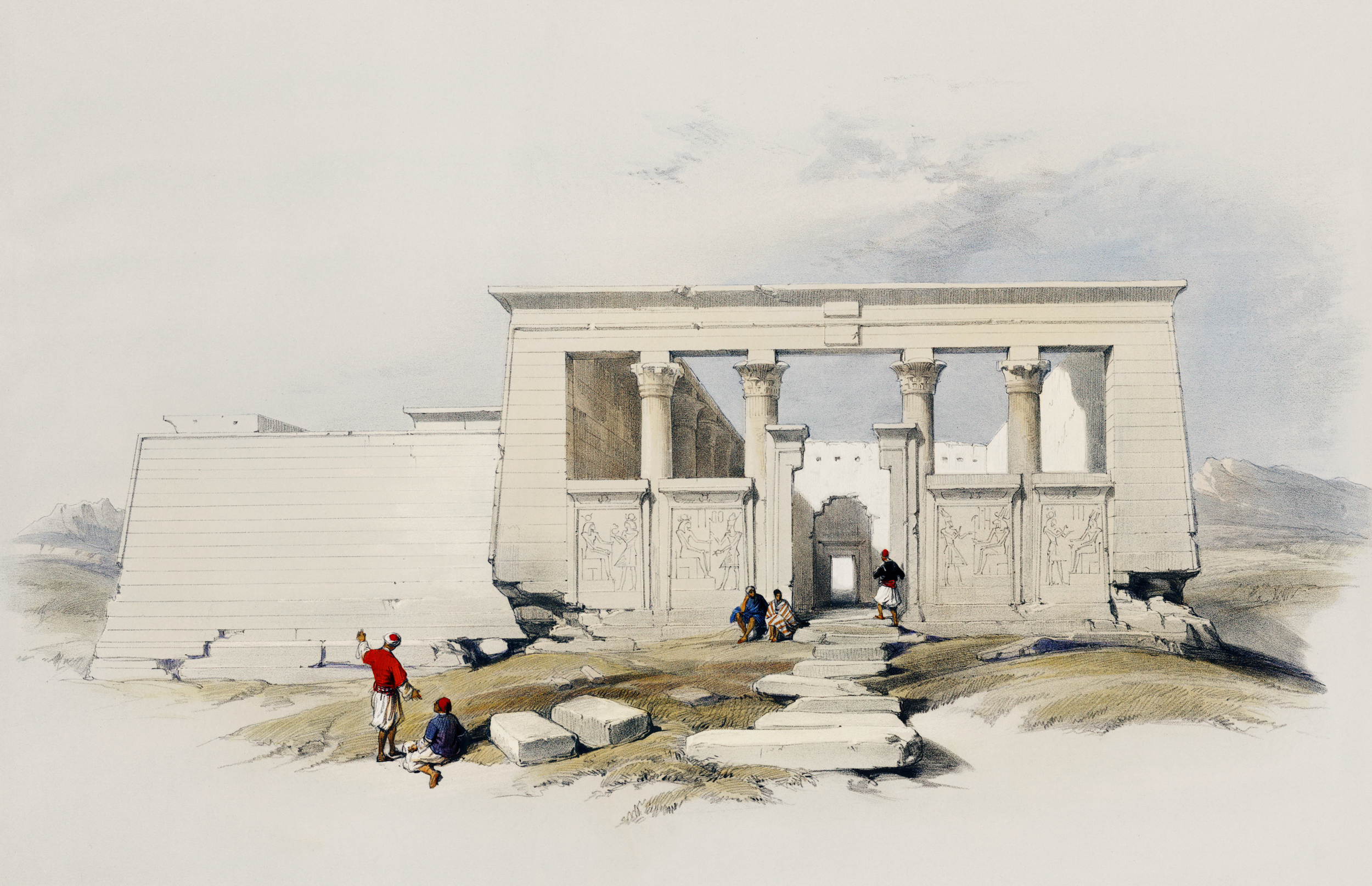
199. Temple of Wady Dabod, Nubia.

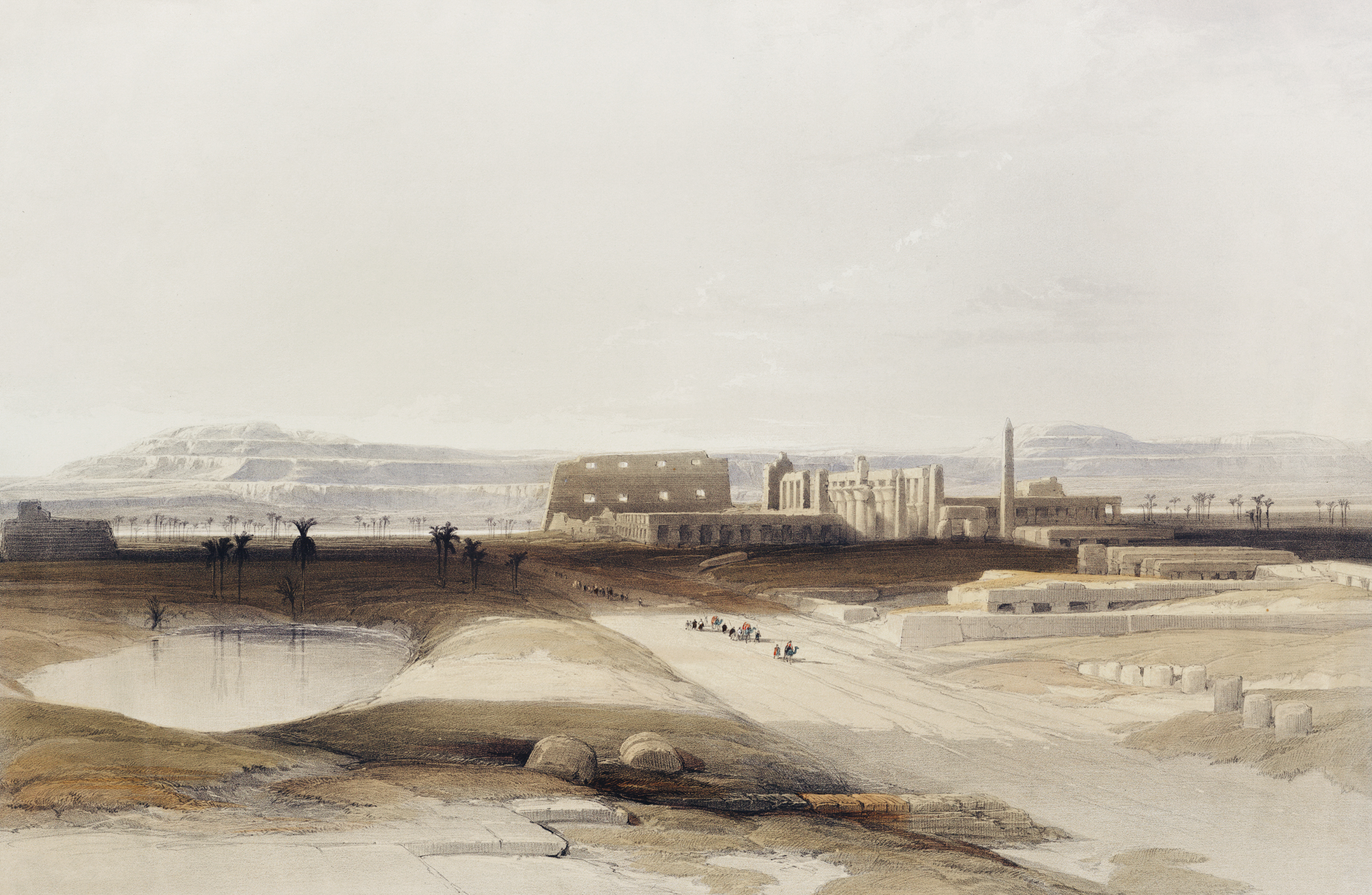
200. General view of Karnac, looking towards Biban-el-Malook.

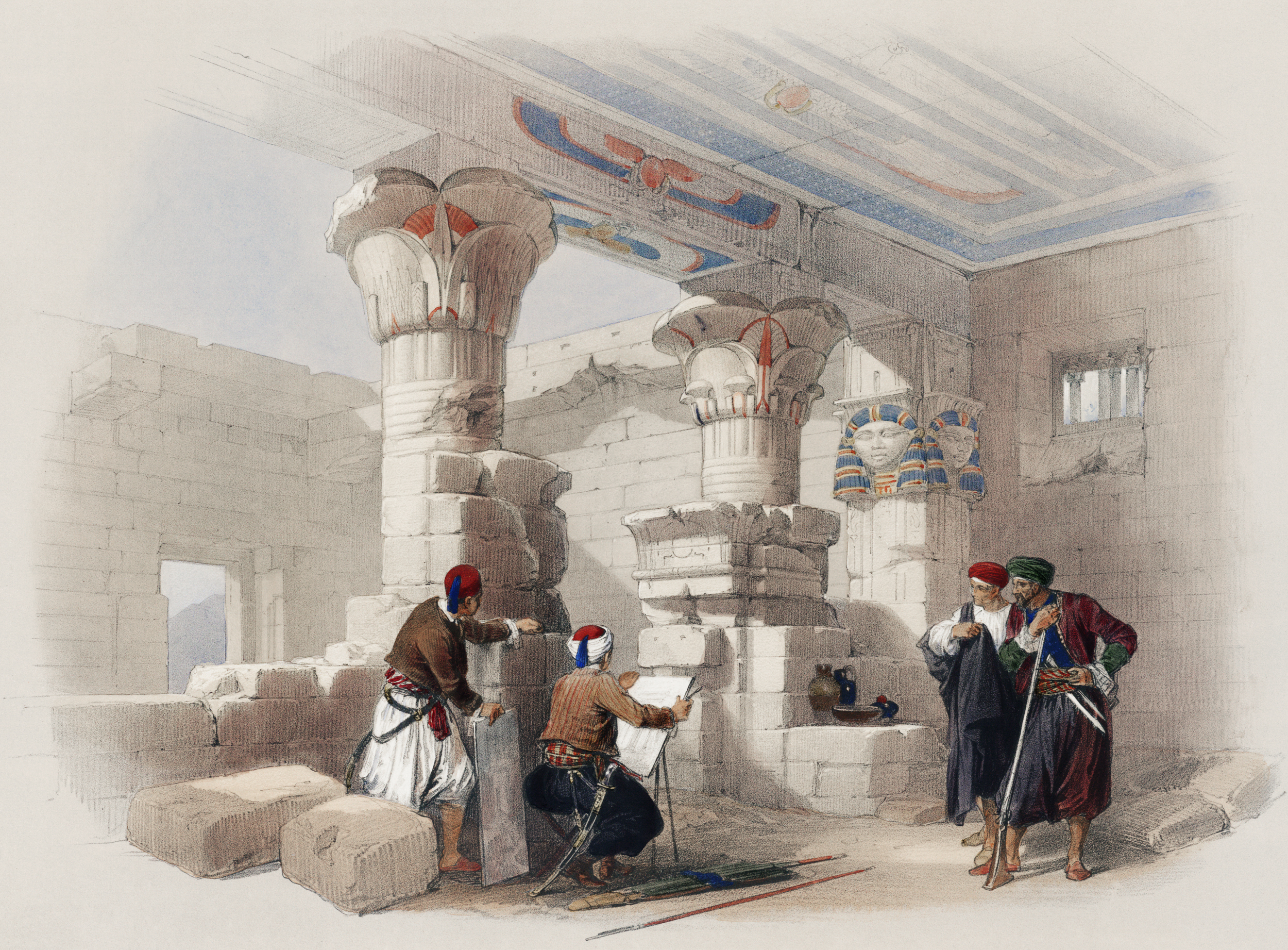
201. View from under the Portico of Dayr-el-Medineh, Thebes.

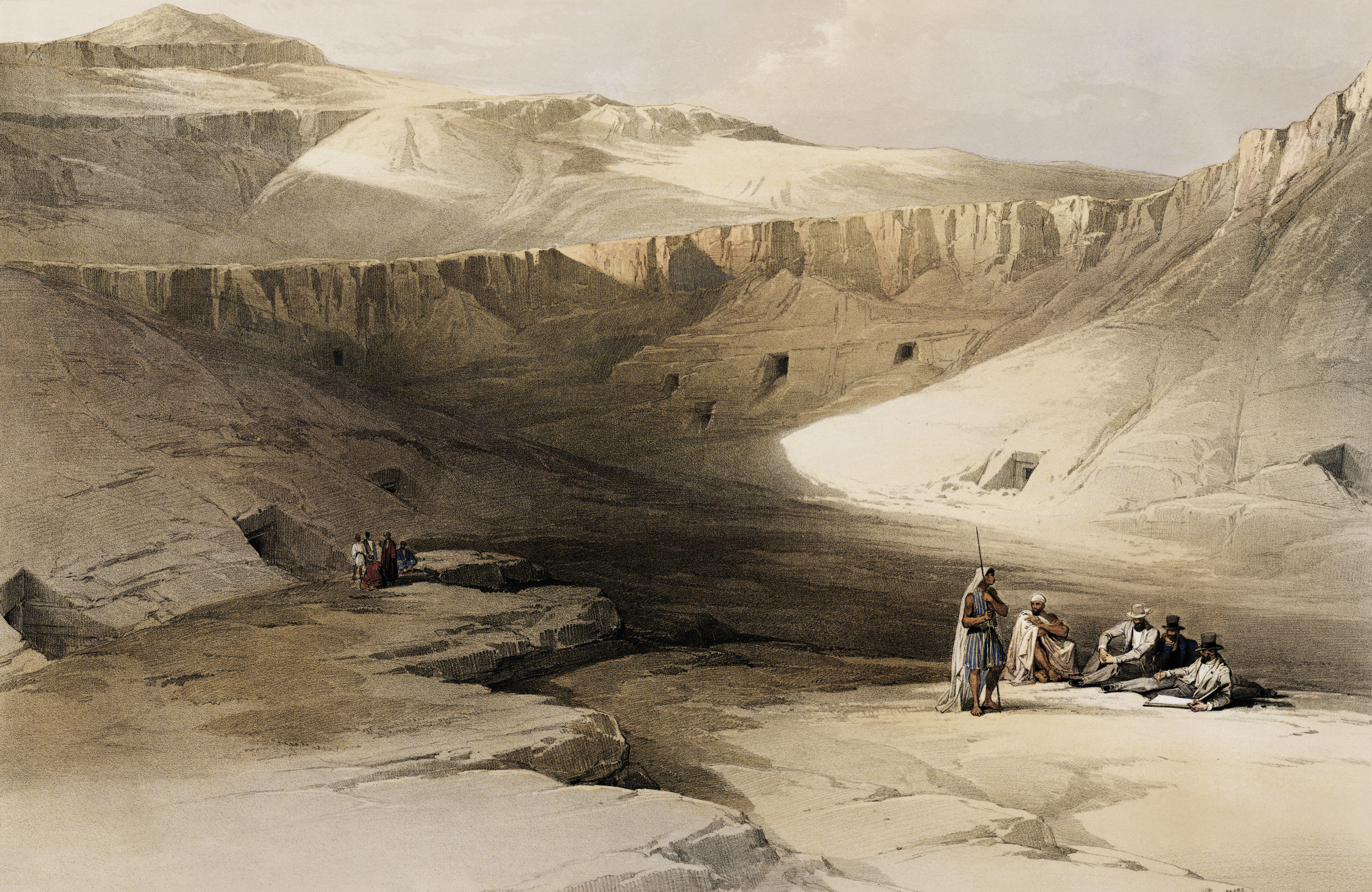
202. Entrance to the Tombs of the Kings, Biban-el-Malook.

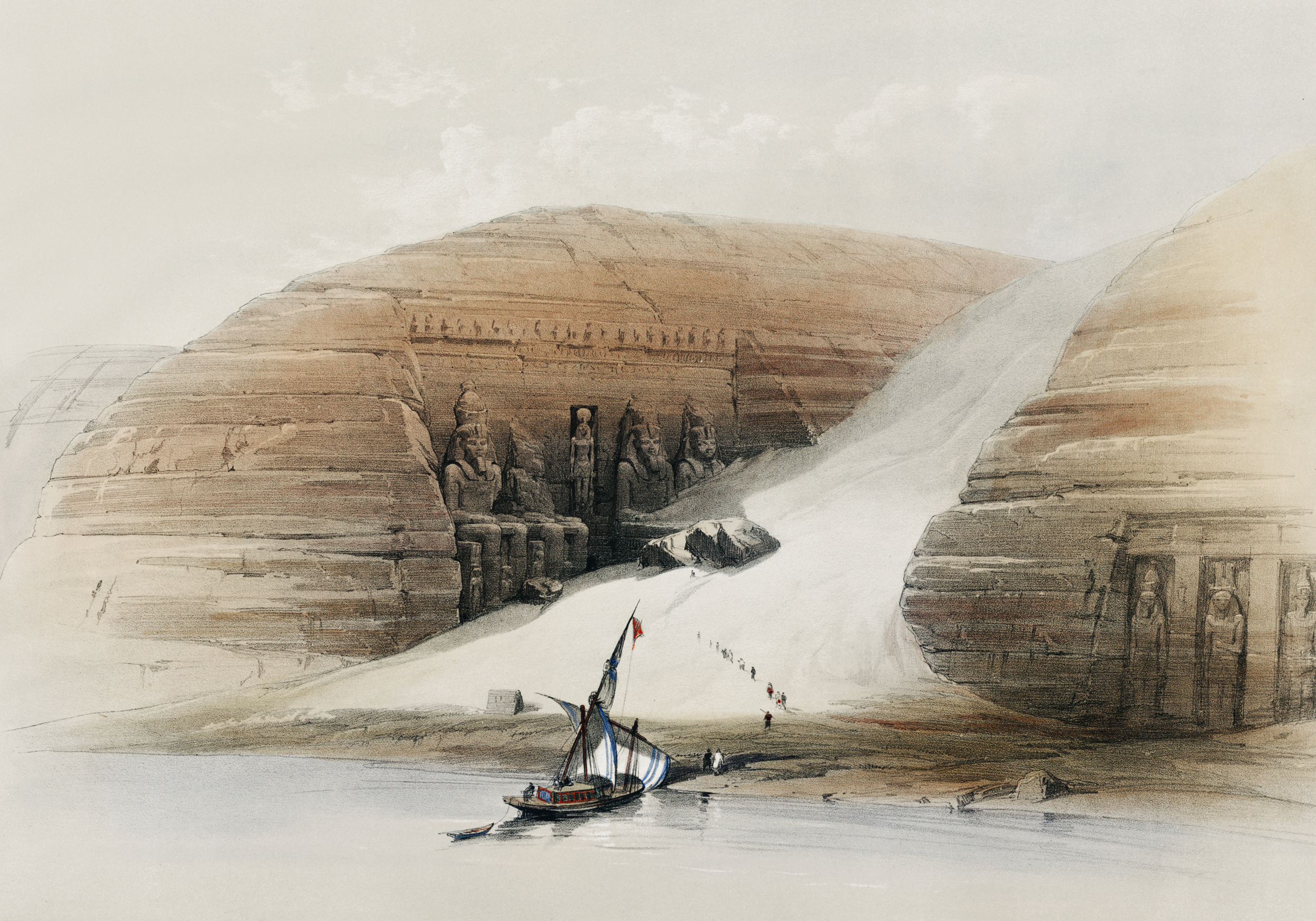
203. The Temples of Aboo-Simbel from the Nile.

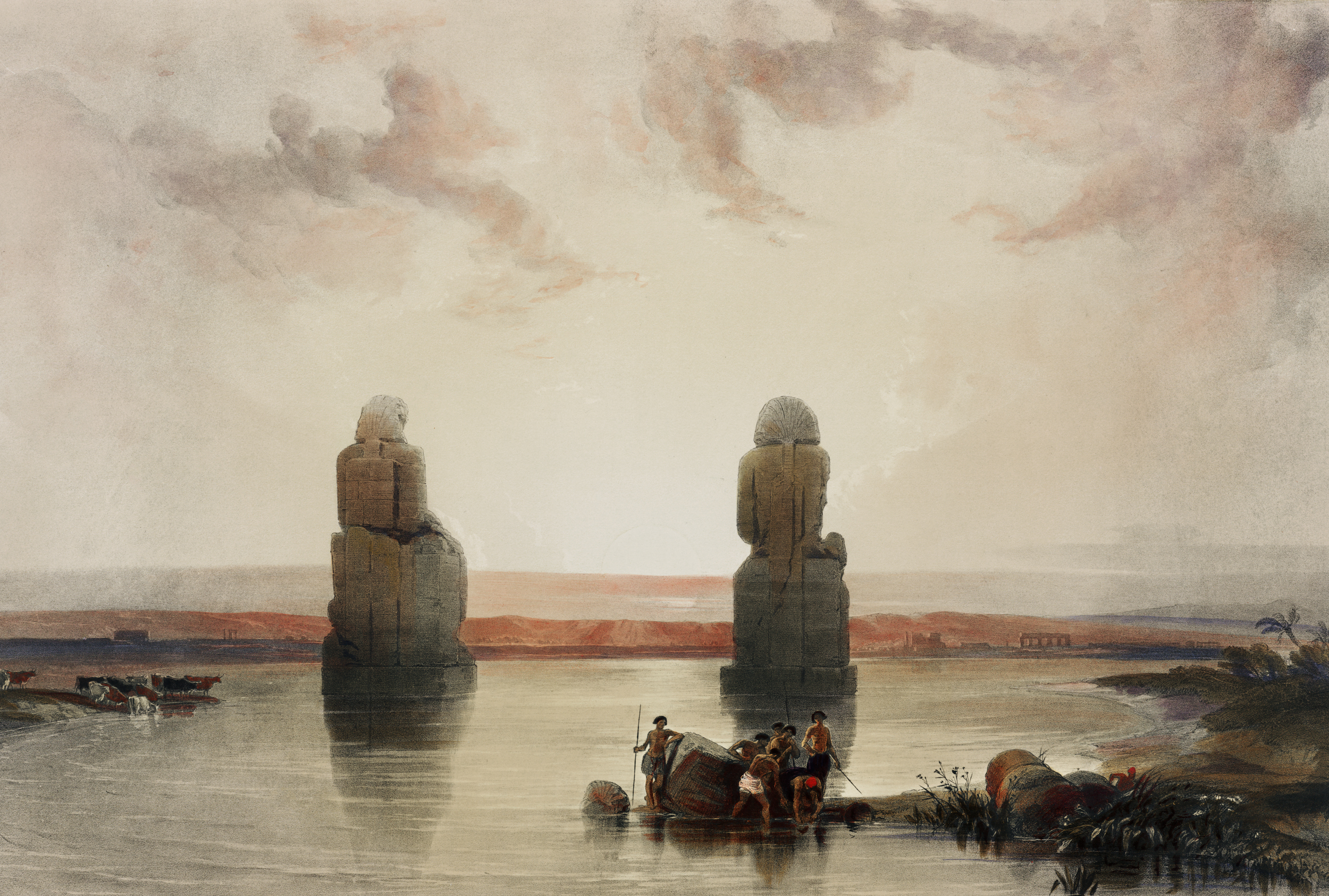
204. Colossal statues in the plain of Thebes, during the inundation of the Nile.

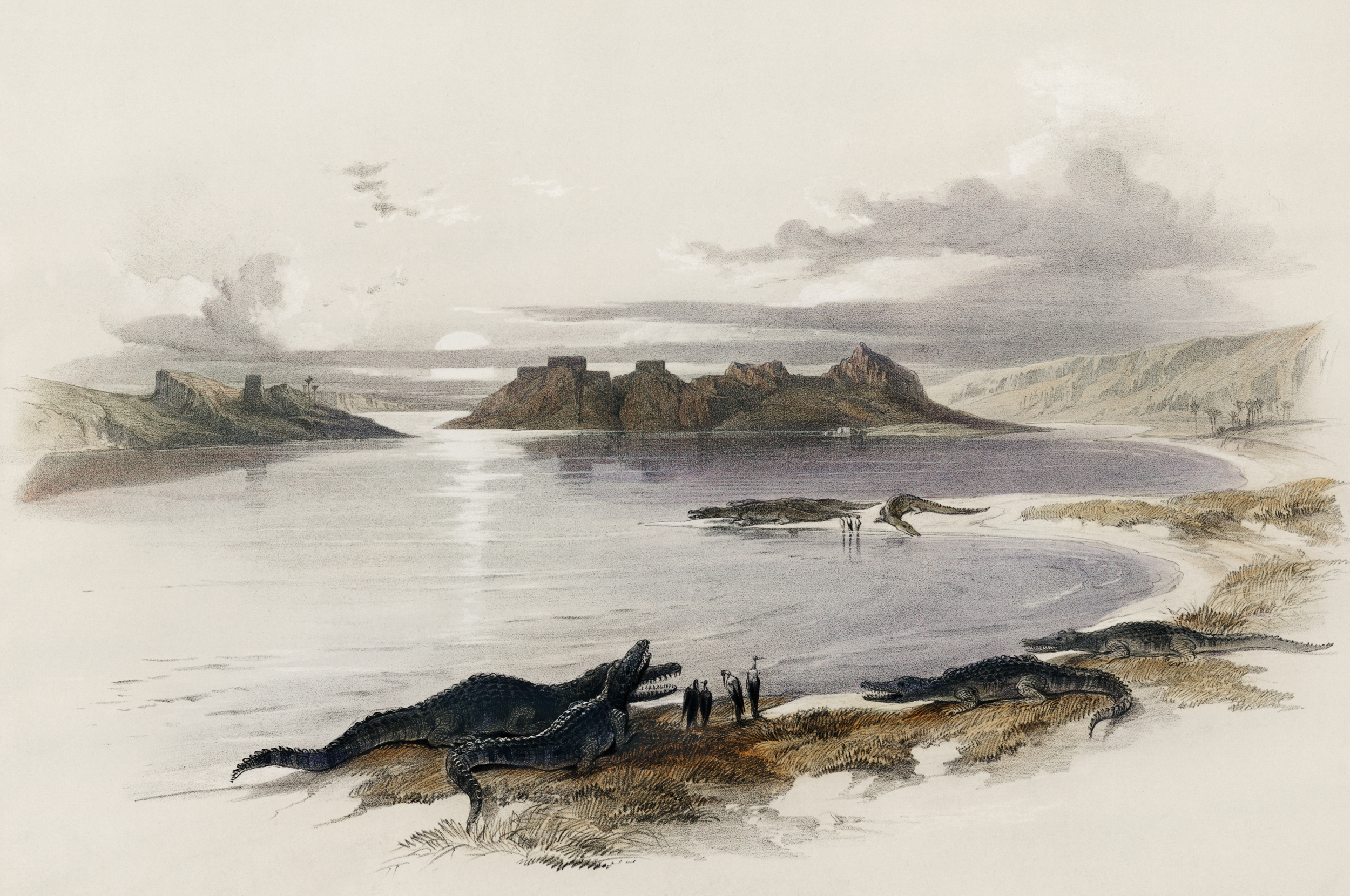
205. Scene on the Nile, near Wady Dabod, with Crocodiles.

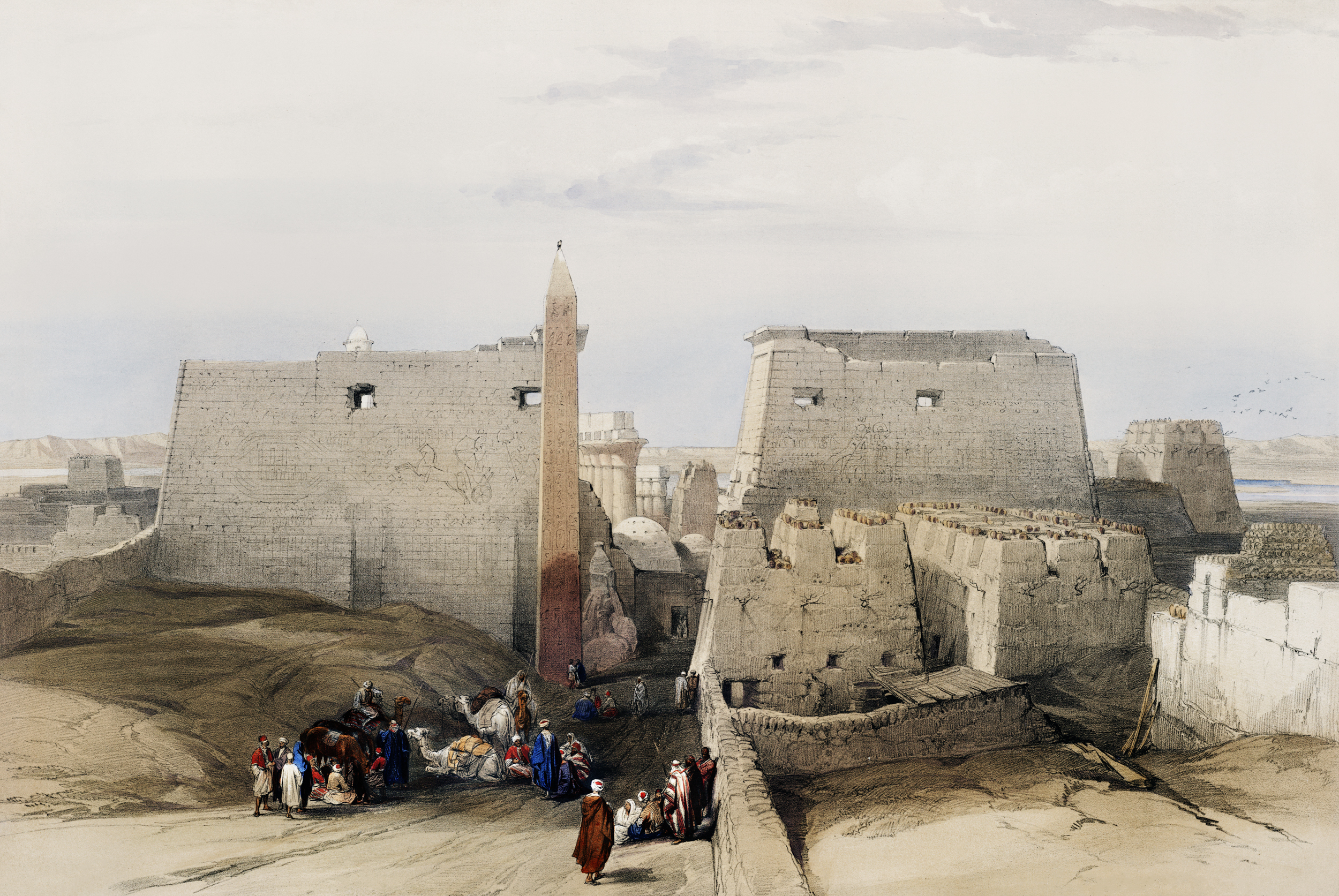
206. Grand entrance to the Temple of Luxor.

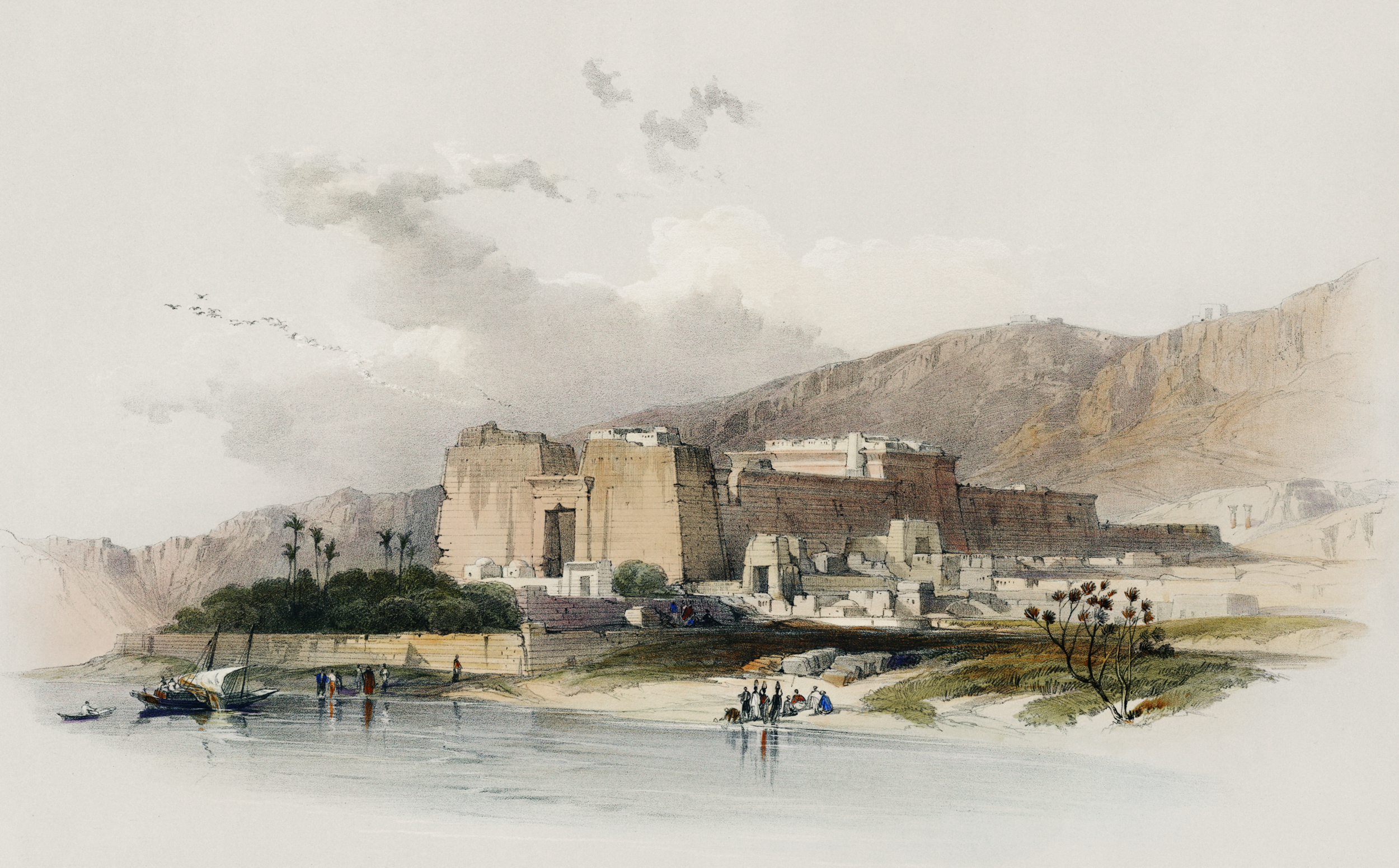
207. General view of Kalabshe, formerly Tolmis, Nubia.

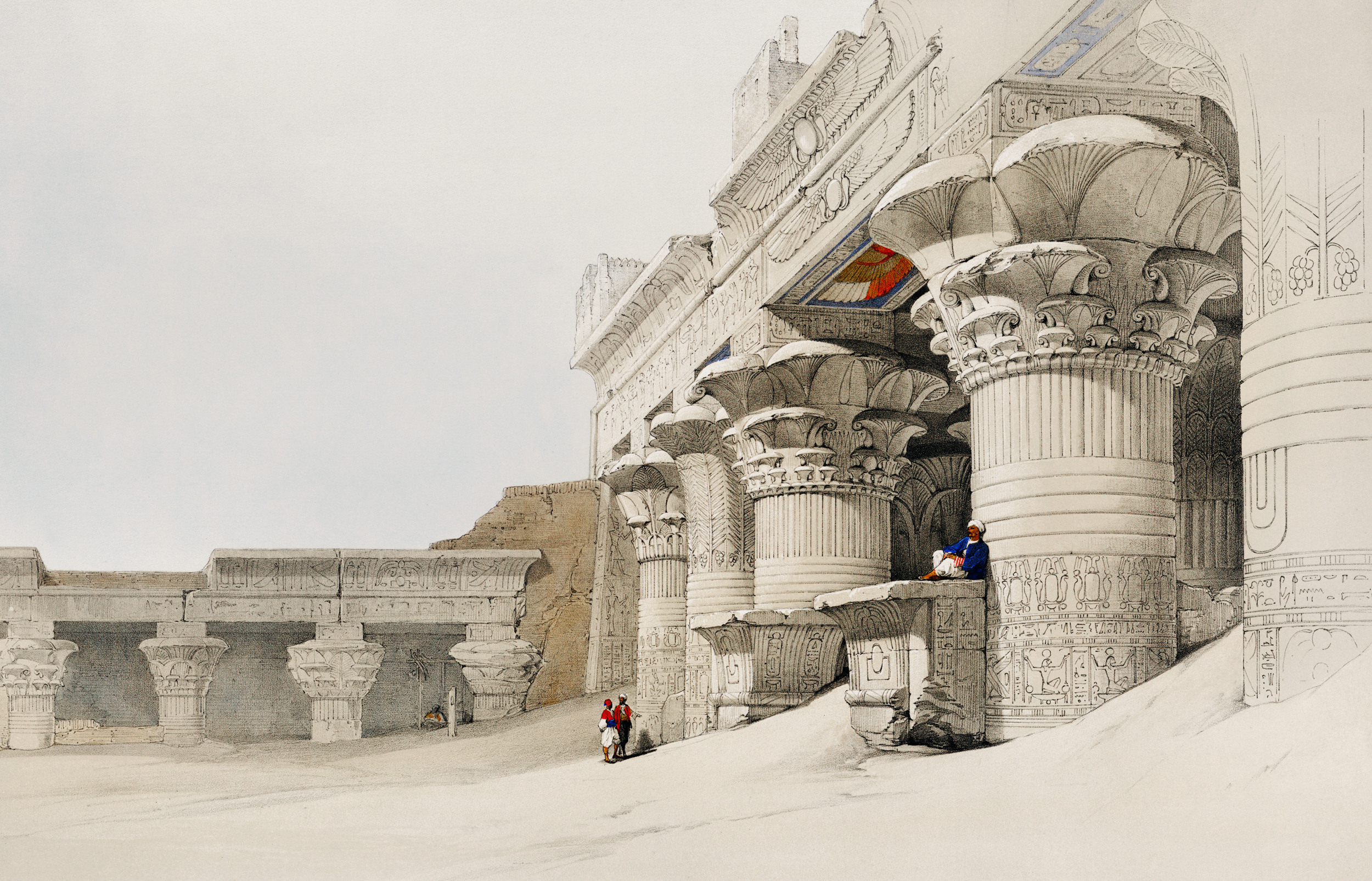
208. Façade of the Pronaos of the Temple of Edfou.

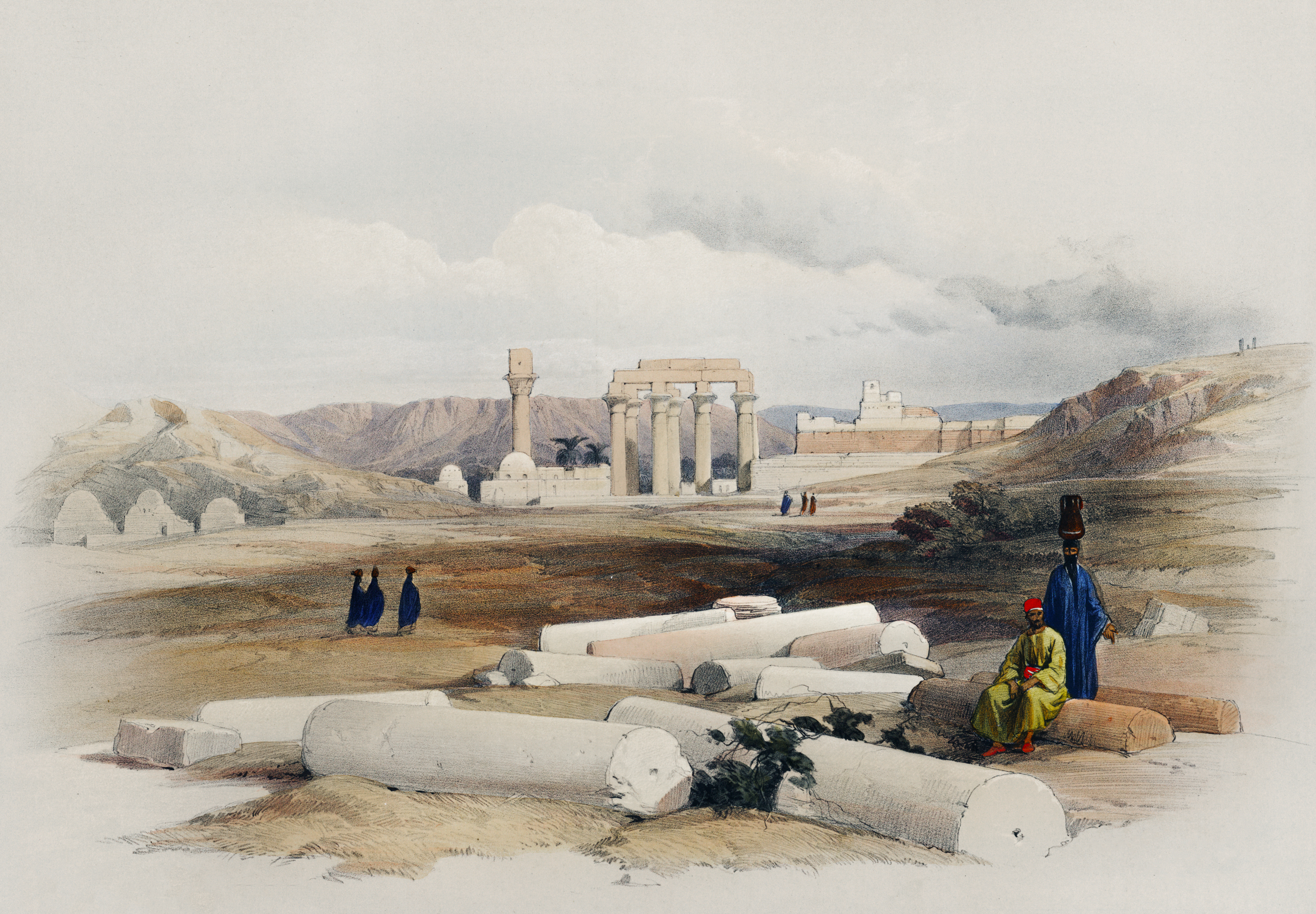
209. Ruins of Erment, ancient Hermontis, Upper Egypt.

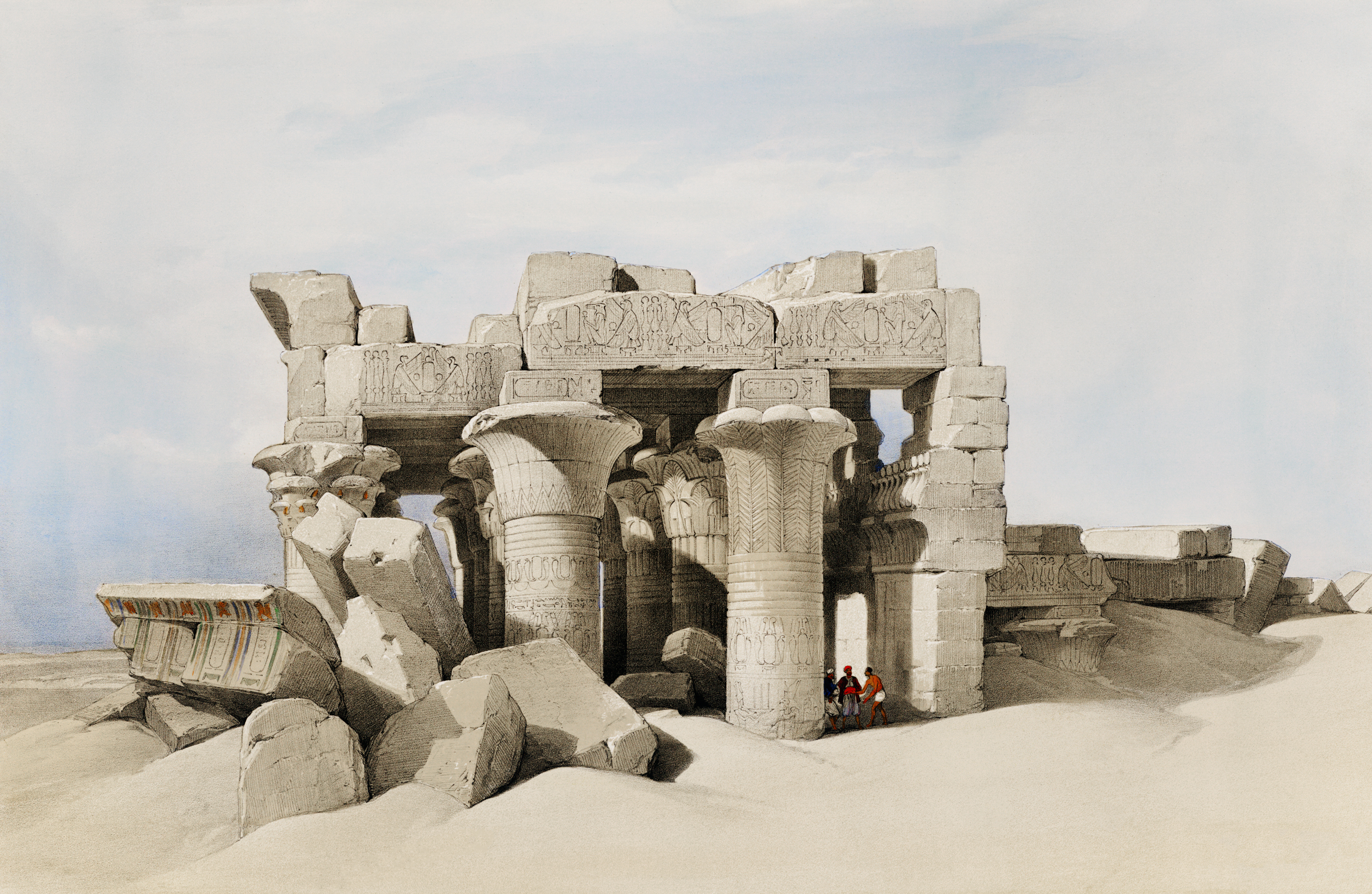
210. Ruins of Kom-Ombo.

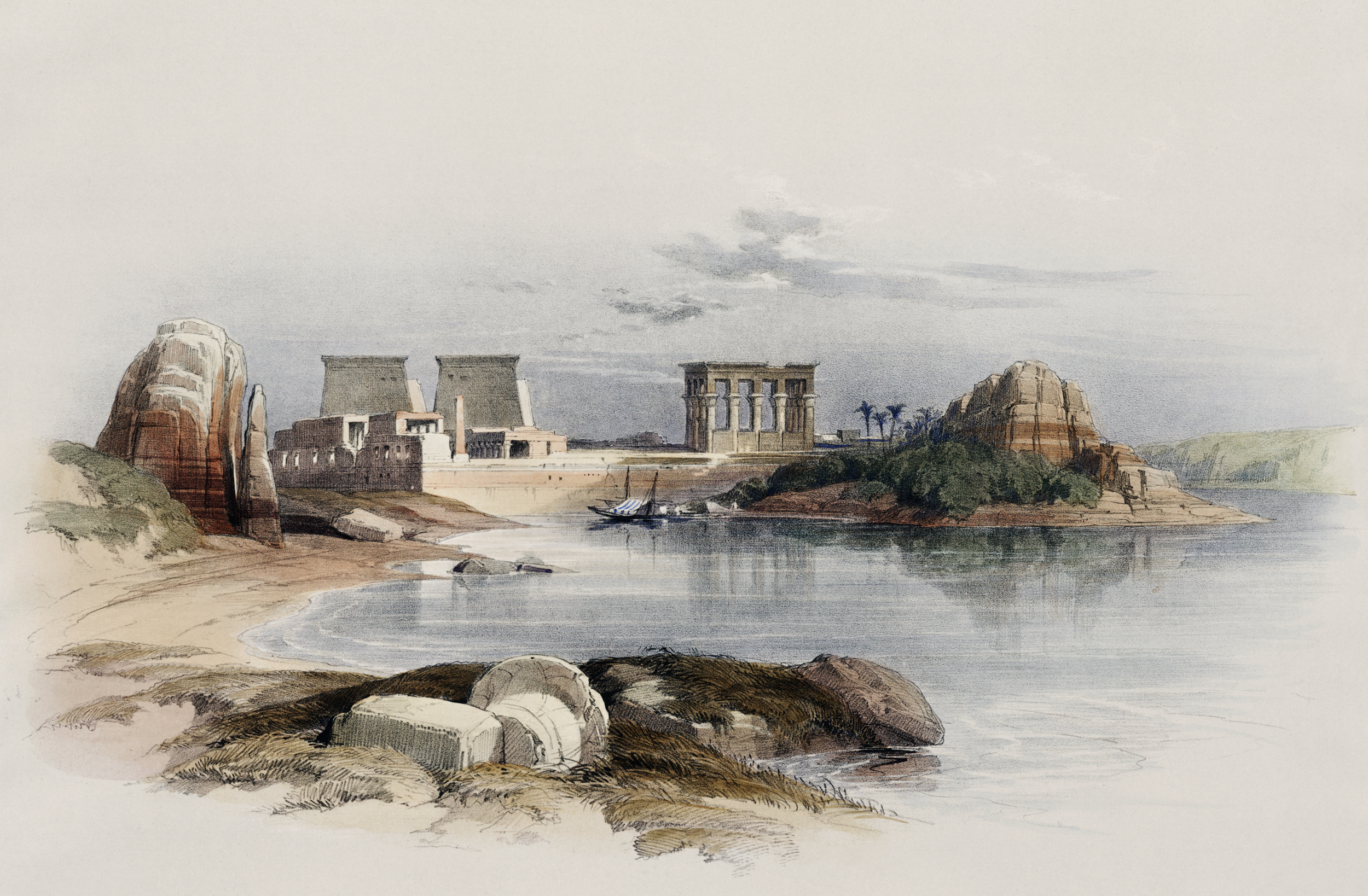
211. Island of Philoe, looking over the Nile.

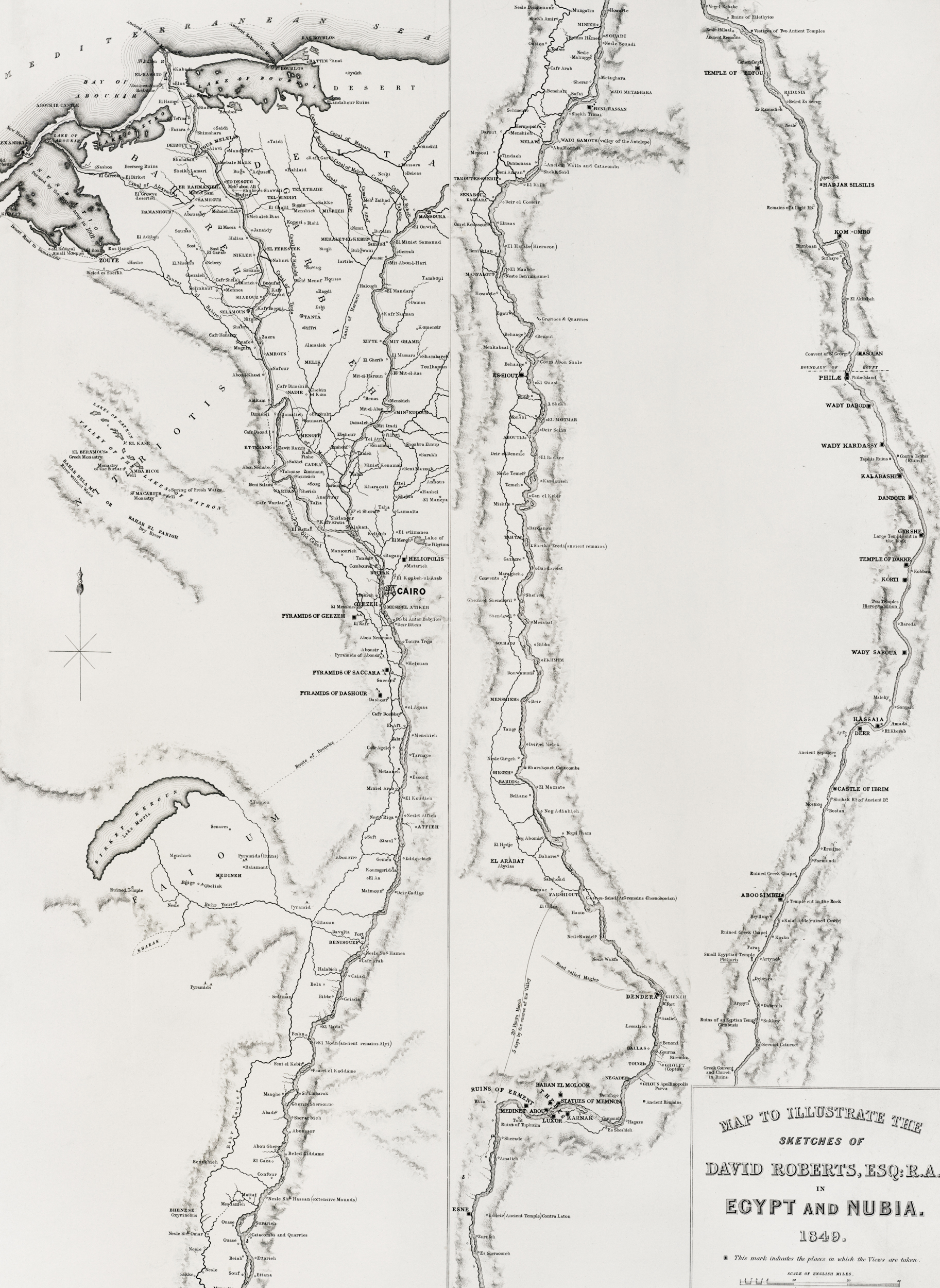
212. [Map] Illustrating the Sketches of David Roberts Esq., in Egypt and Nubia, 1849.

=== Volume 6 ===
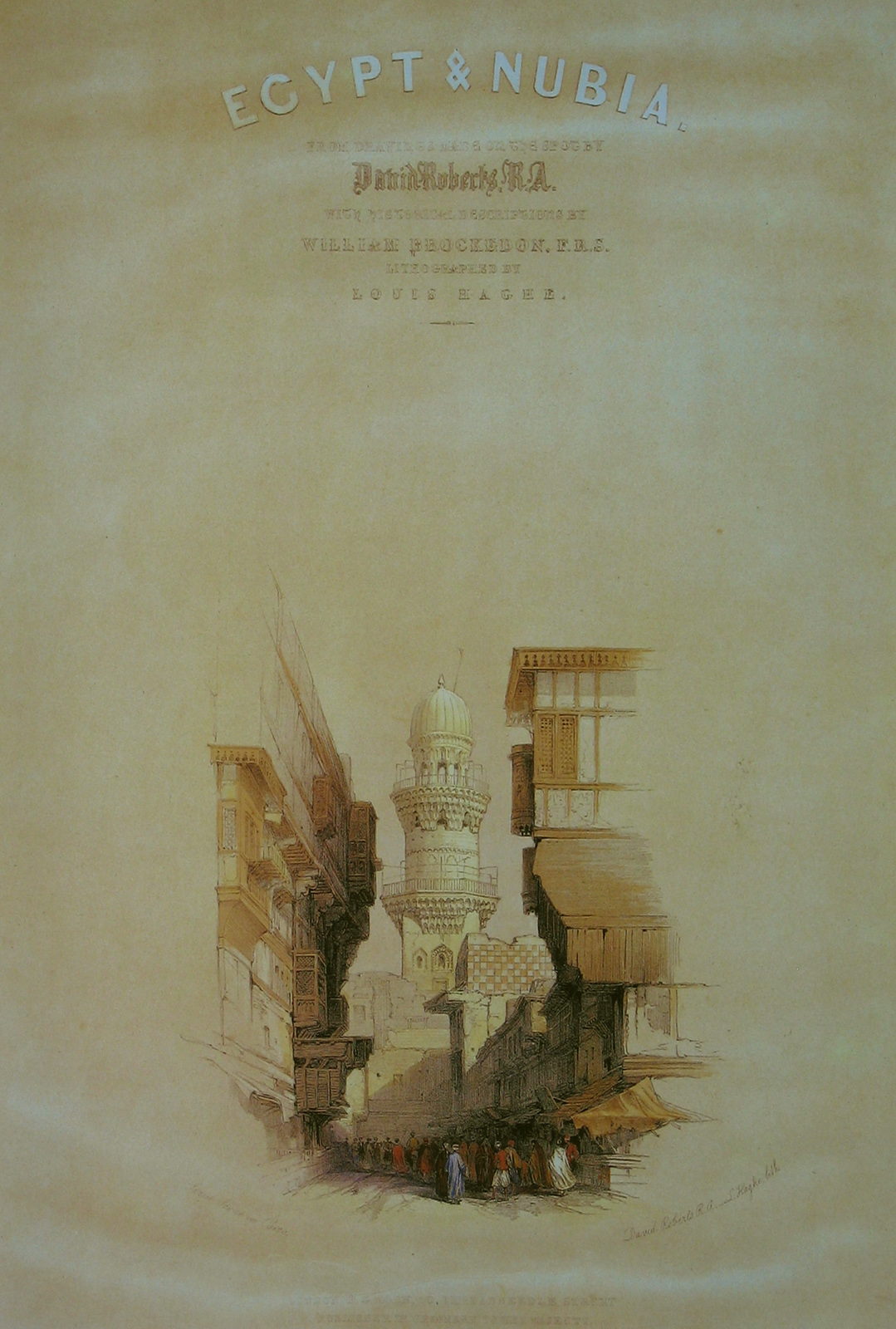
214. Title page. Scene in a street in Cairo.

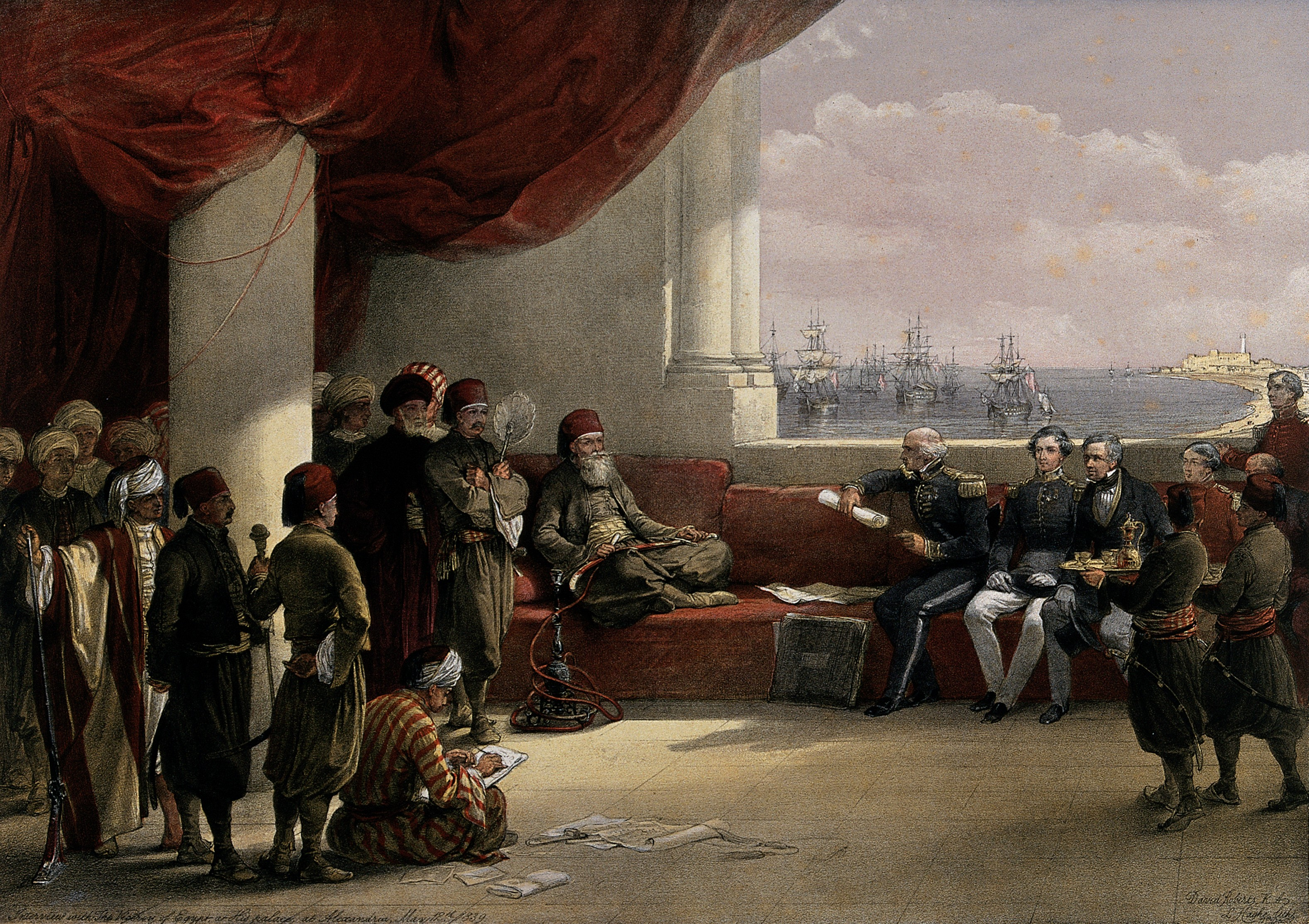
213. Frontispiece. Interview with Mehemet Ali in his palace, Alexandria.

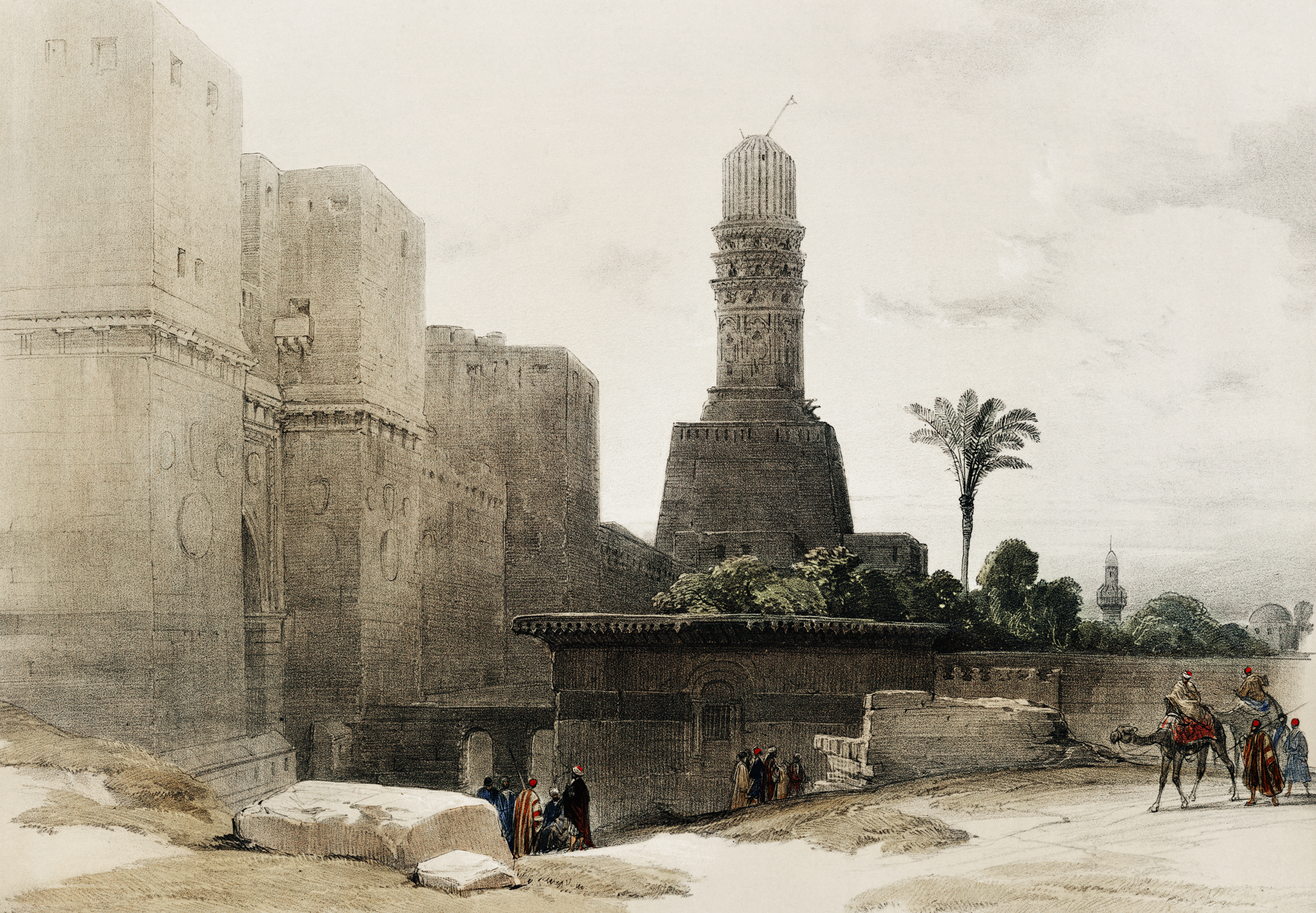
215. Bab-en-Nasr or Gate of Victory and Mosque of El-Hakim. Cairo.

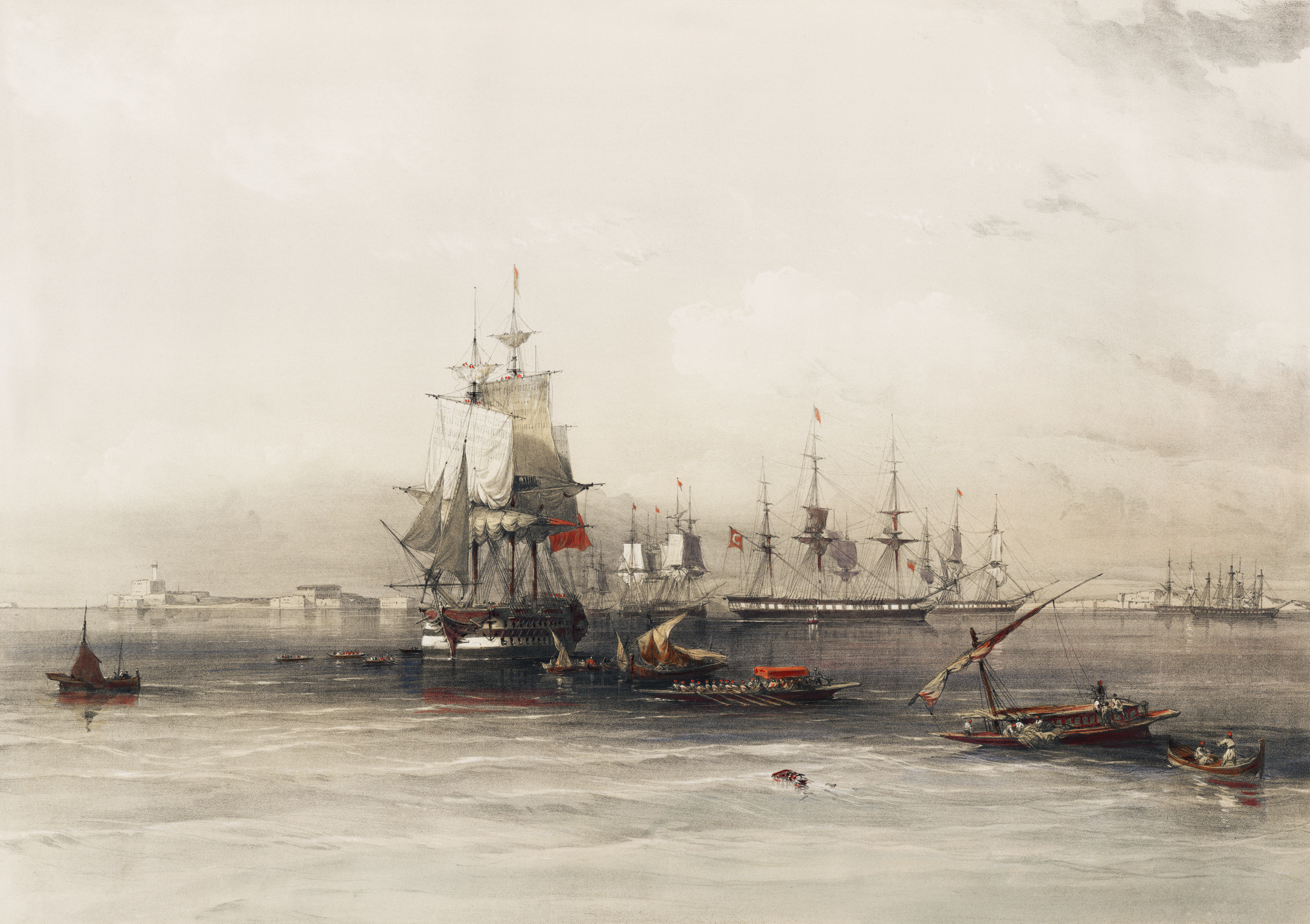
216. Approach to Alexandria.

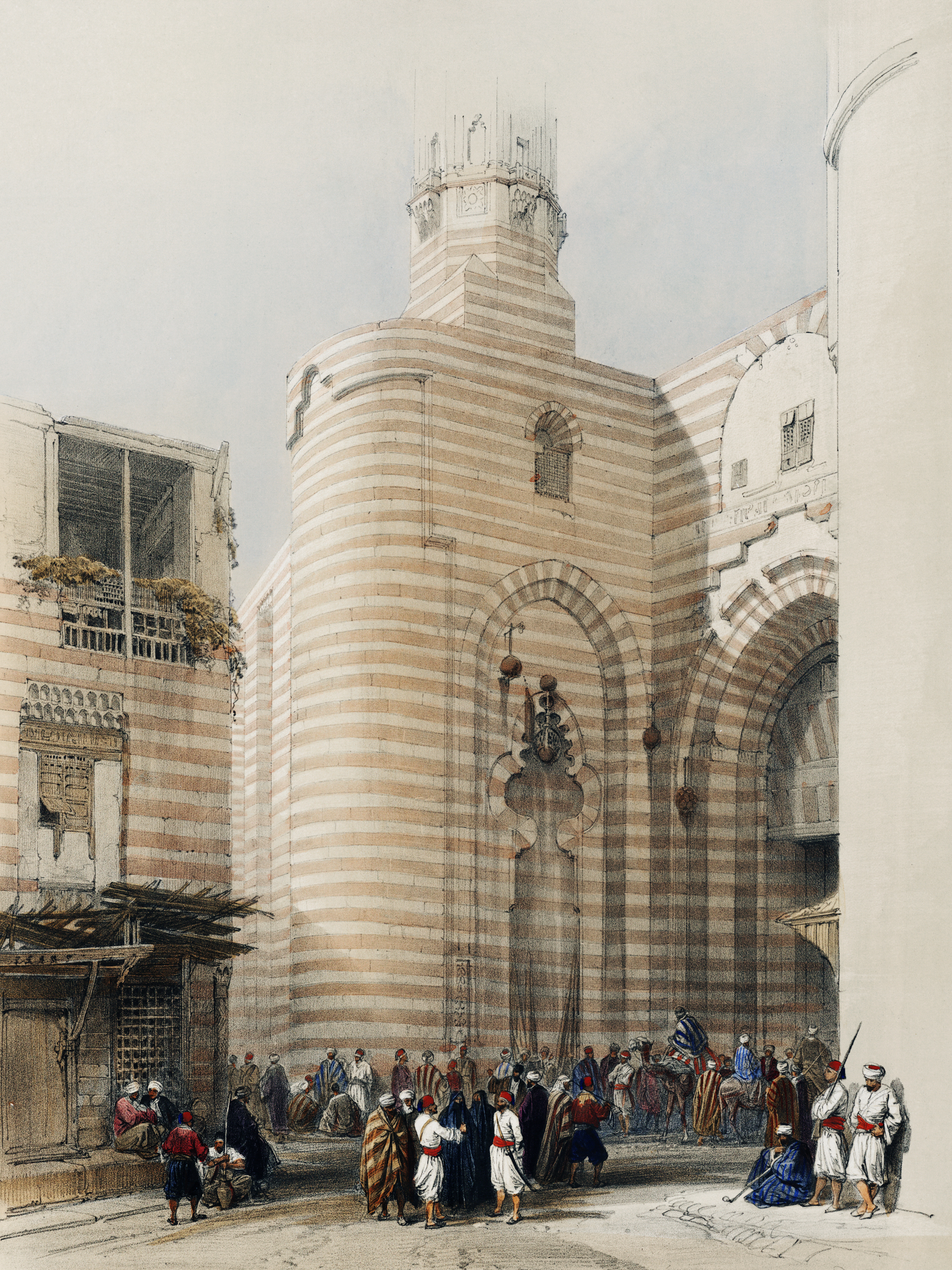
217. The gate of the Metwalis, or Bab Zuweyleh, Cairo.

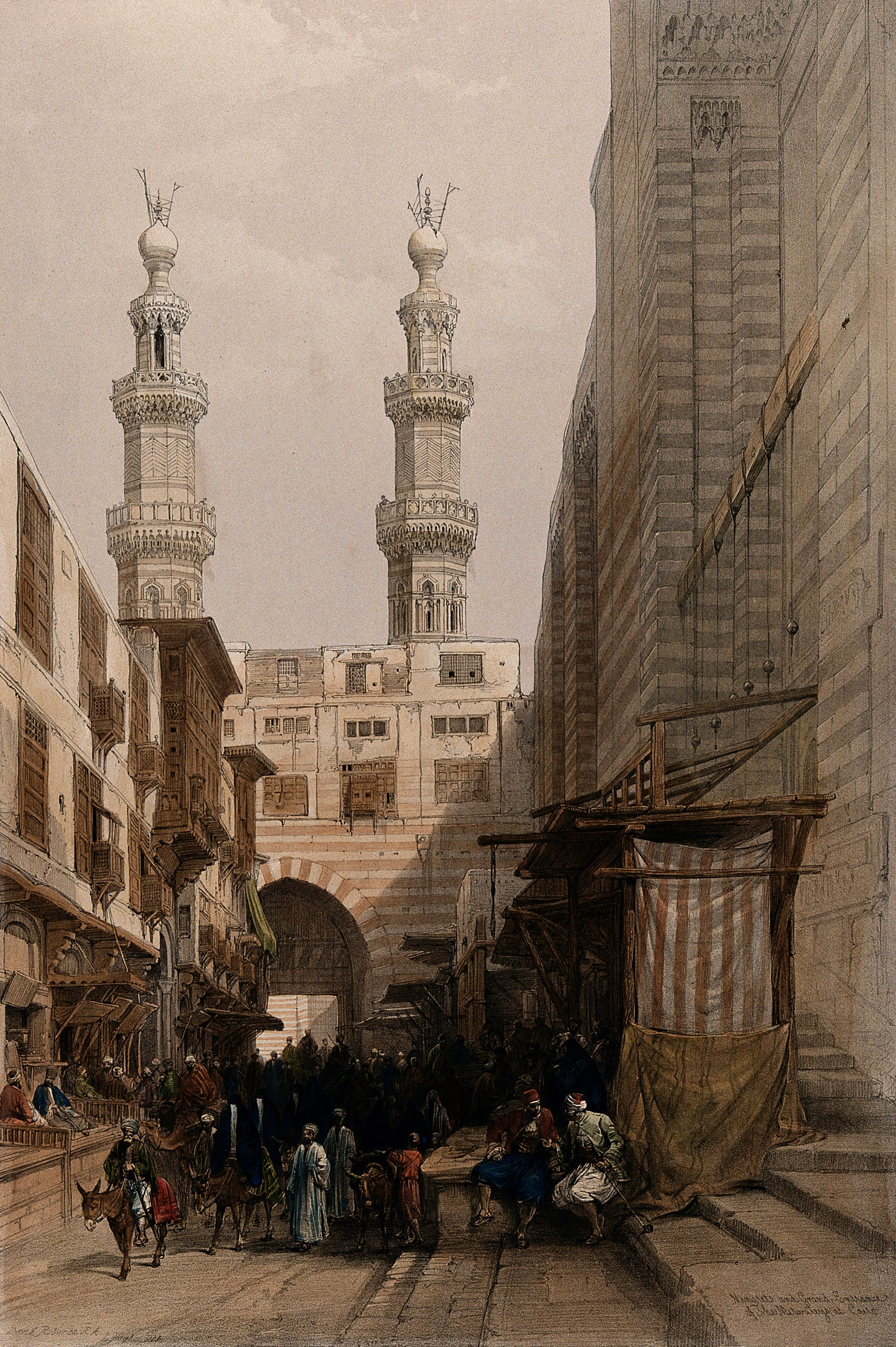
218. The minarets at the Bab Zuweyleh, and entrance to the mosque of the Metwalis

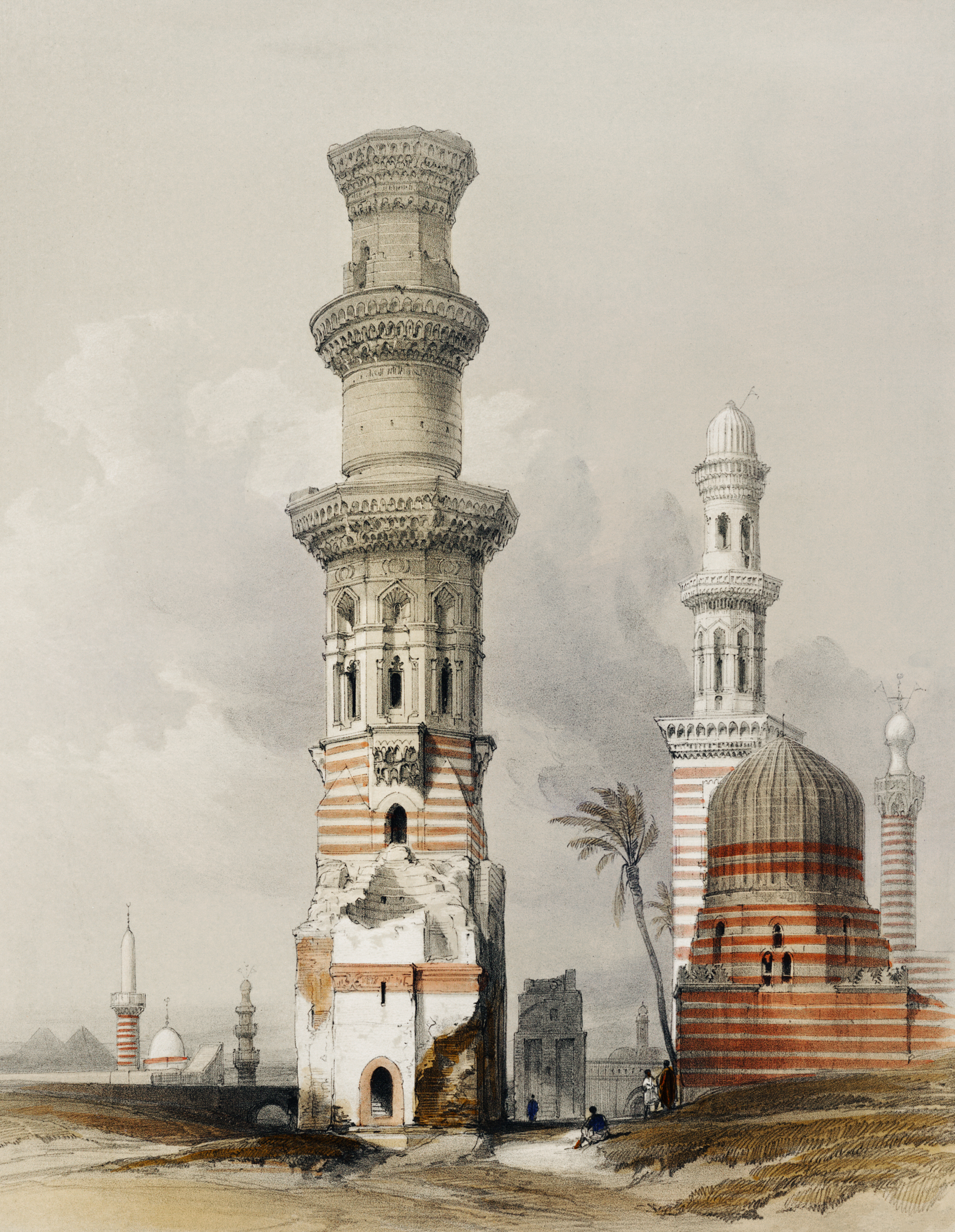
219. Ruined Mosques in the desert, west of the Citadel.

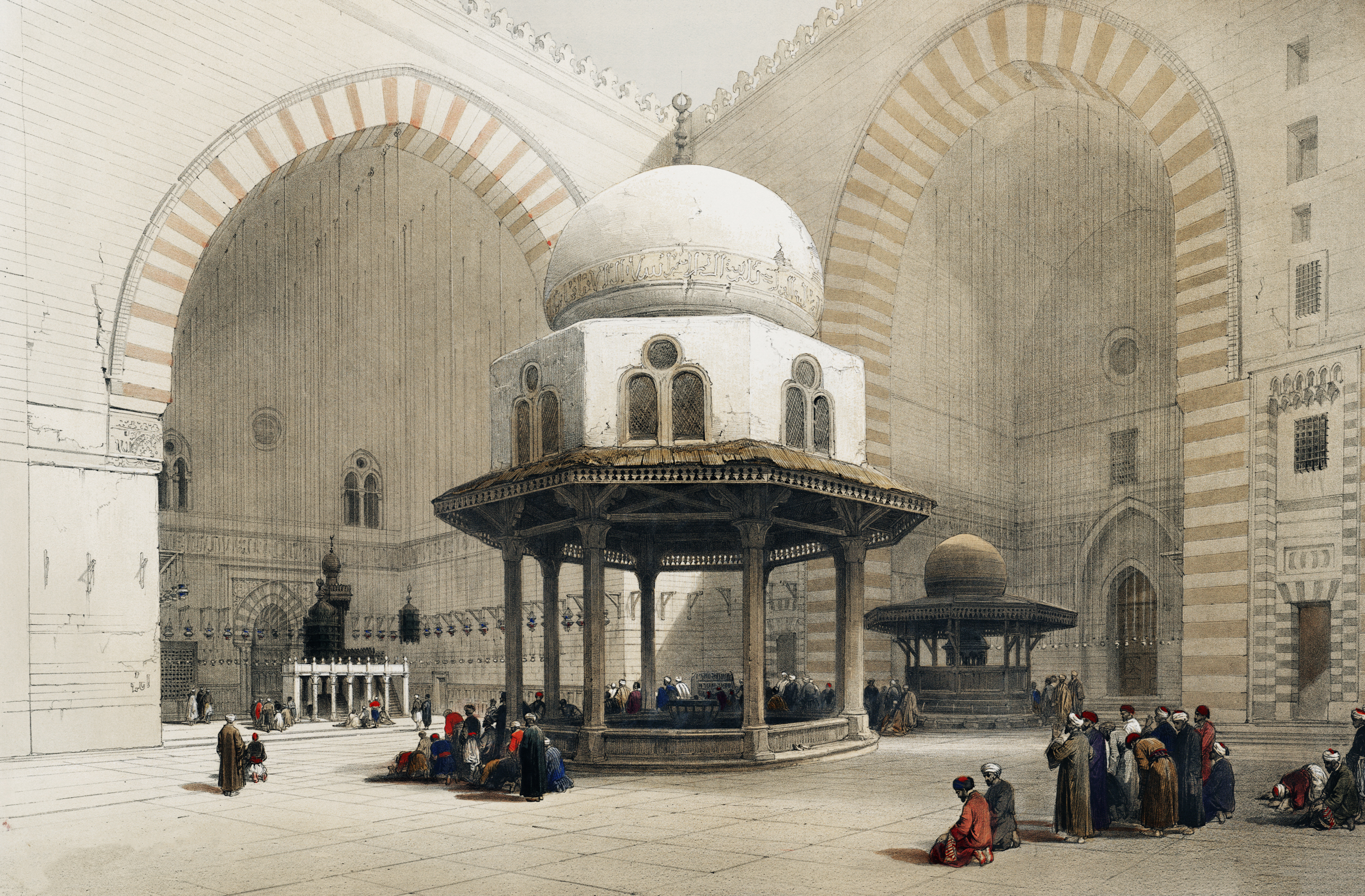
220. Interior of the Mosque of the Sultan Hassan.

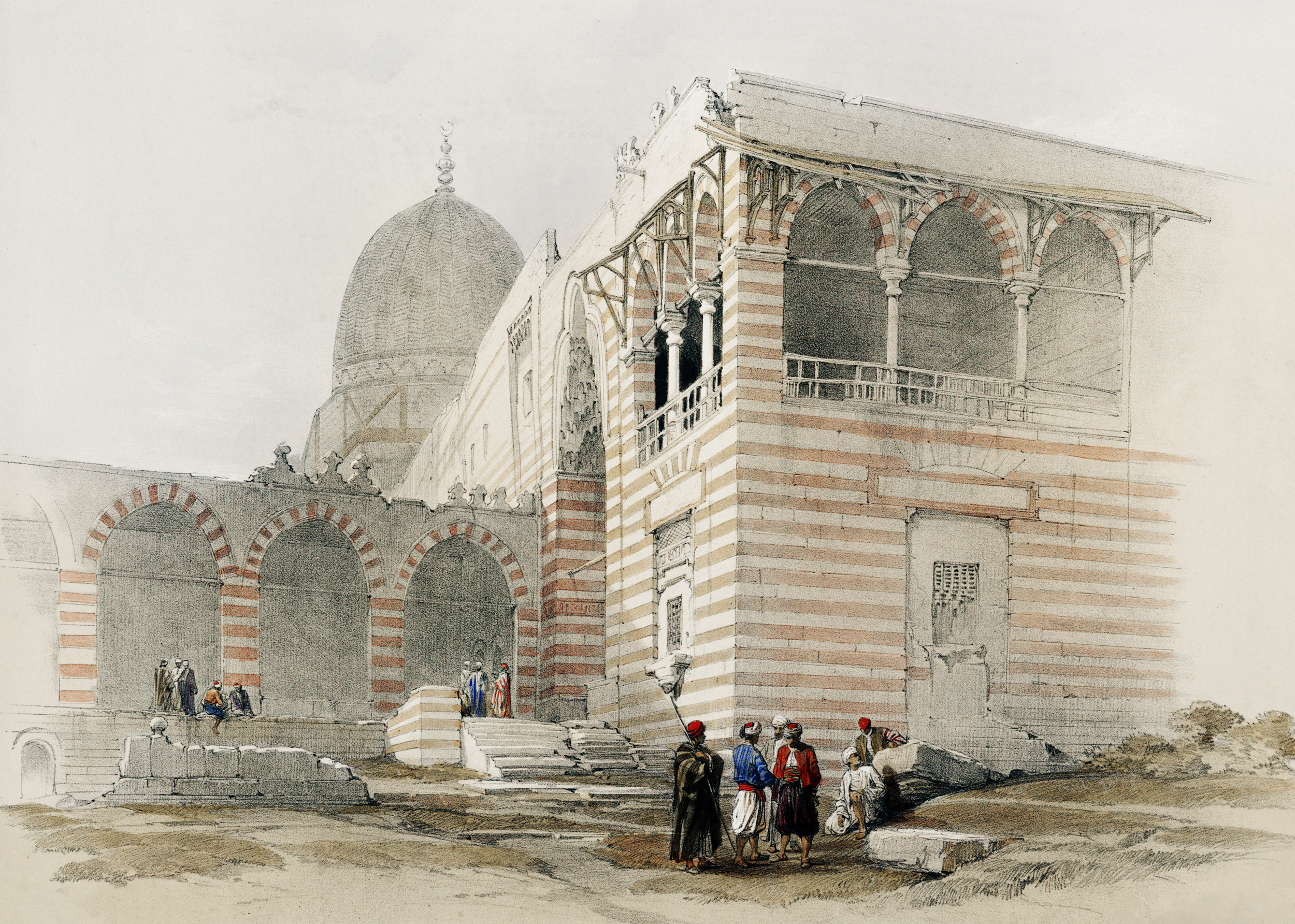
221. One of the Tombs of the Caliphs, Cairo.

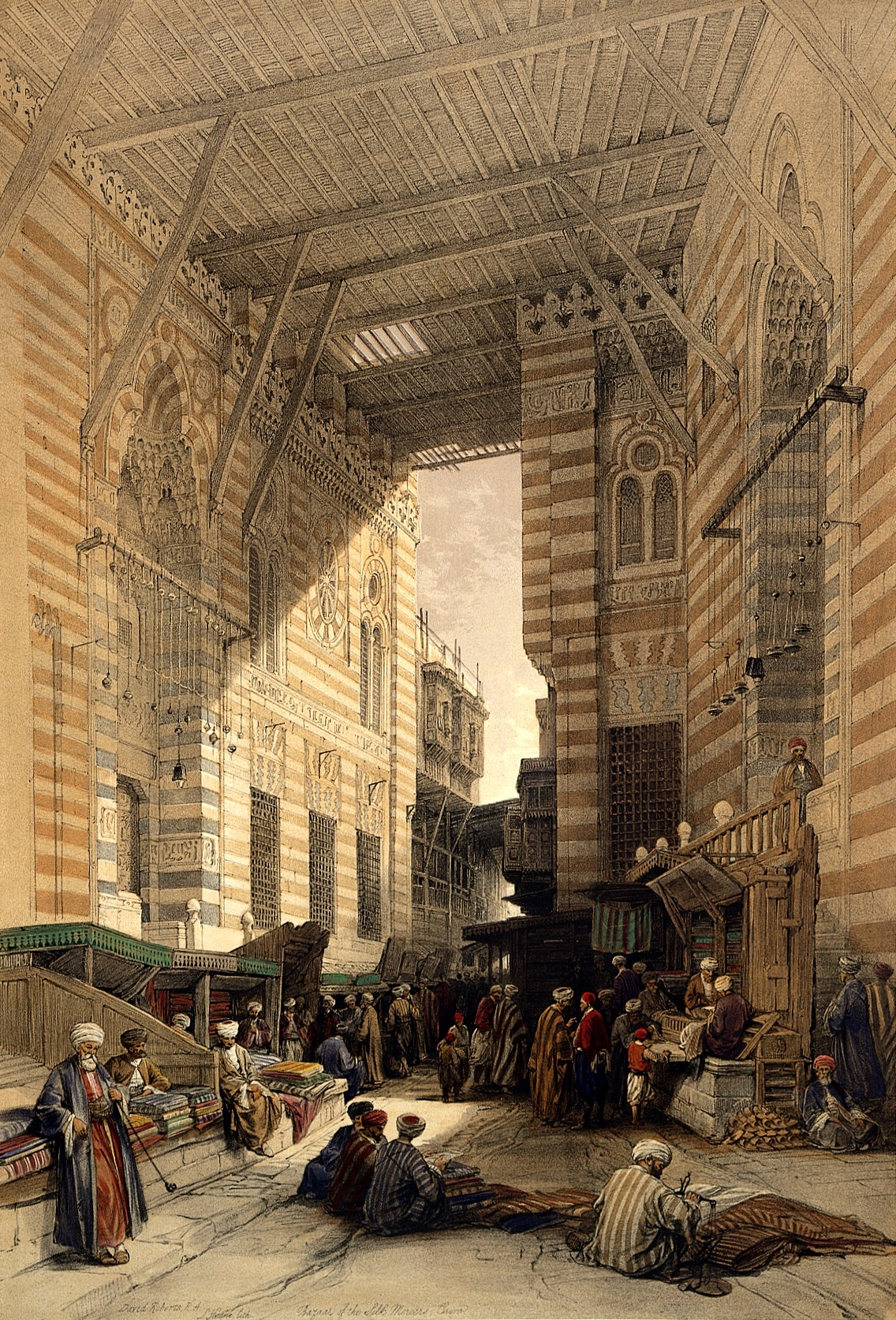
222. The Silk-Mercer's Bazaar or El-Ghatreshyeh, Cairo.

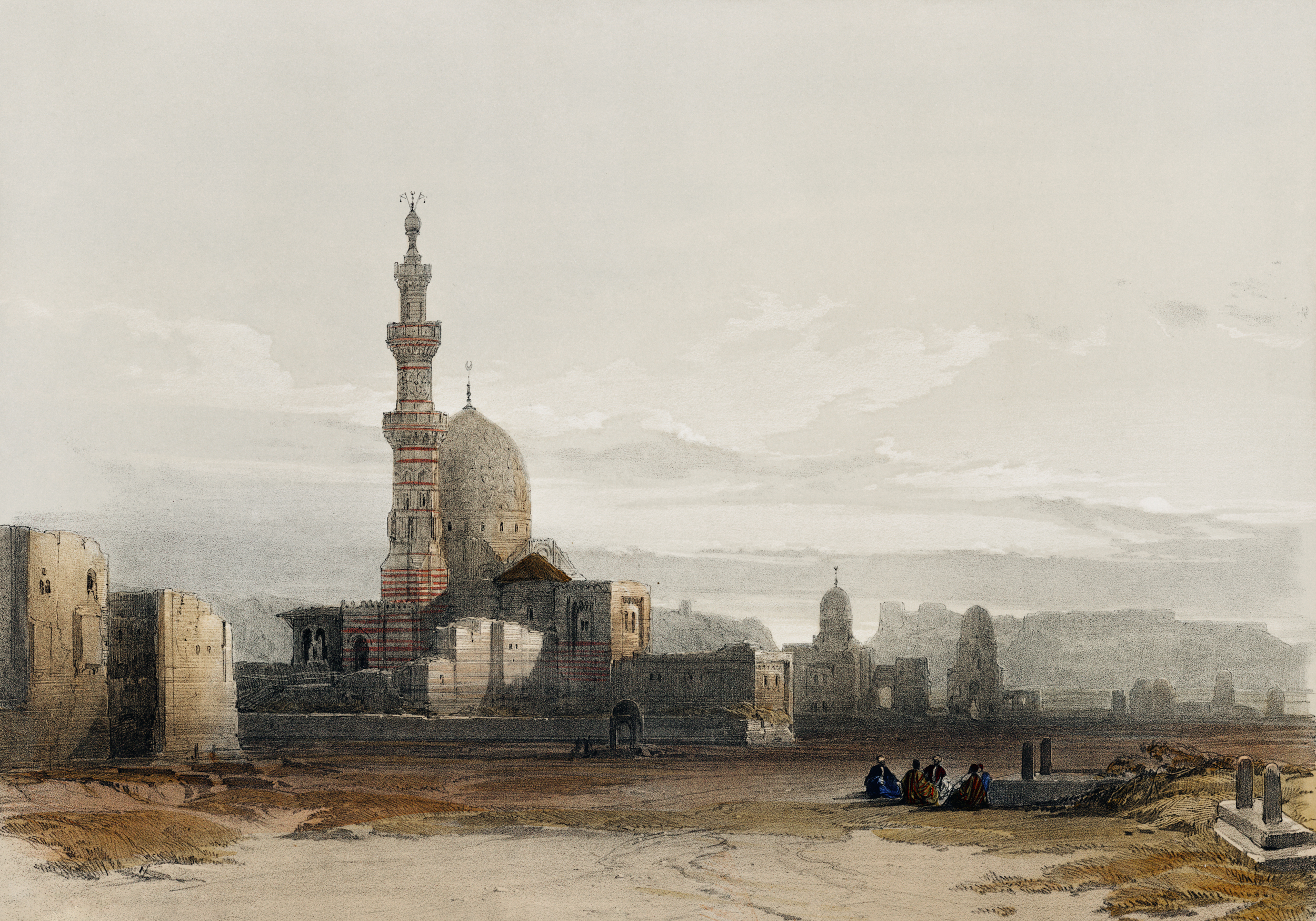
223. Tombs of the Caliphs, Cairo. The Citadel in the distance.

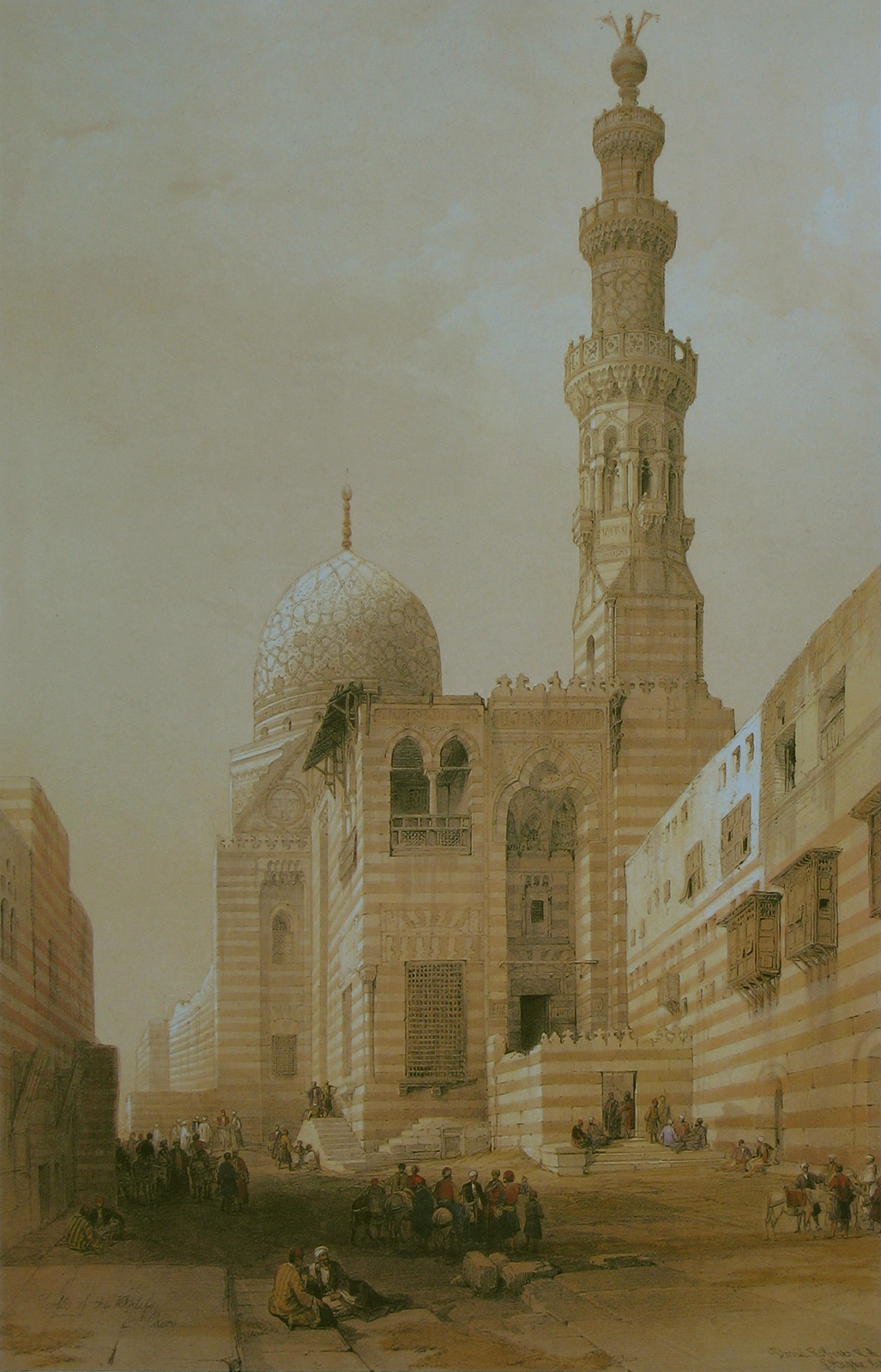
224. Mosque of the Sultan Kaitbey, Cairo.

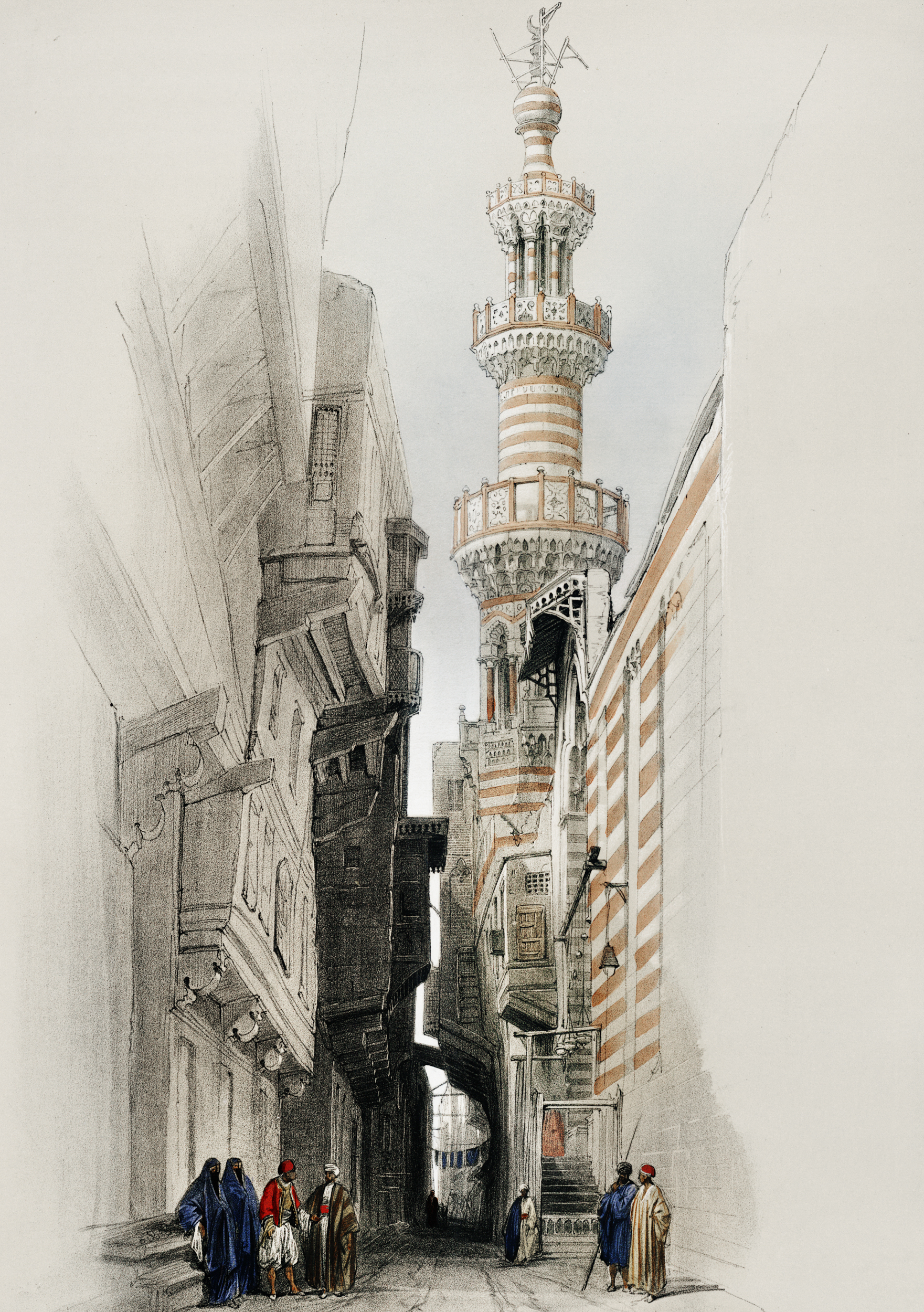
225. Minaret of the Mosque El-Khomree.

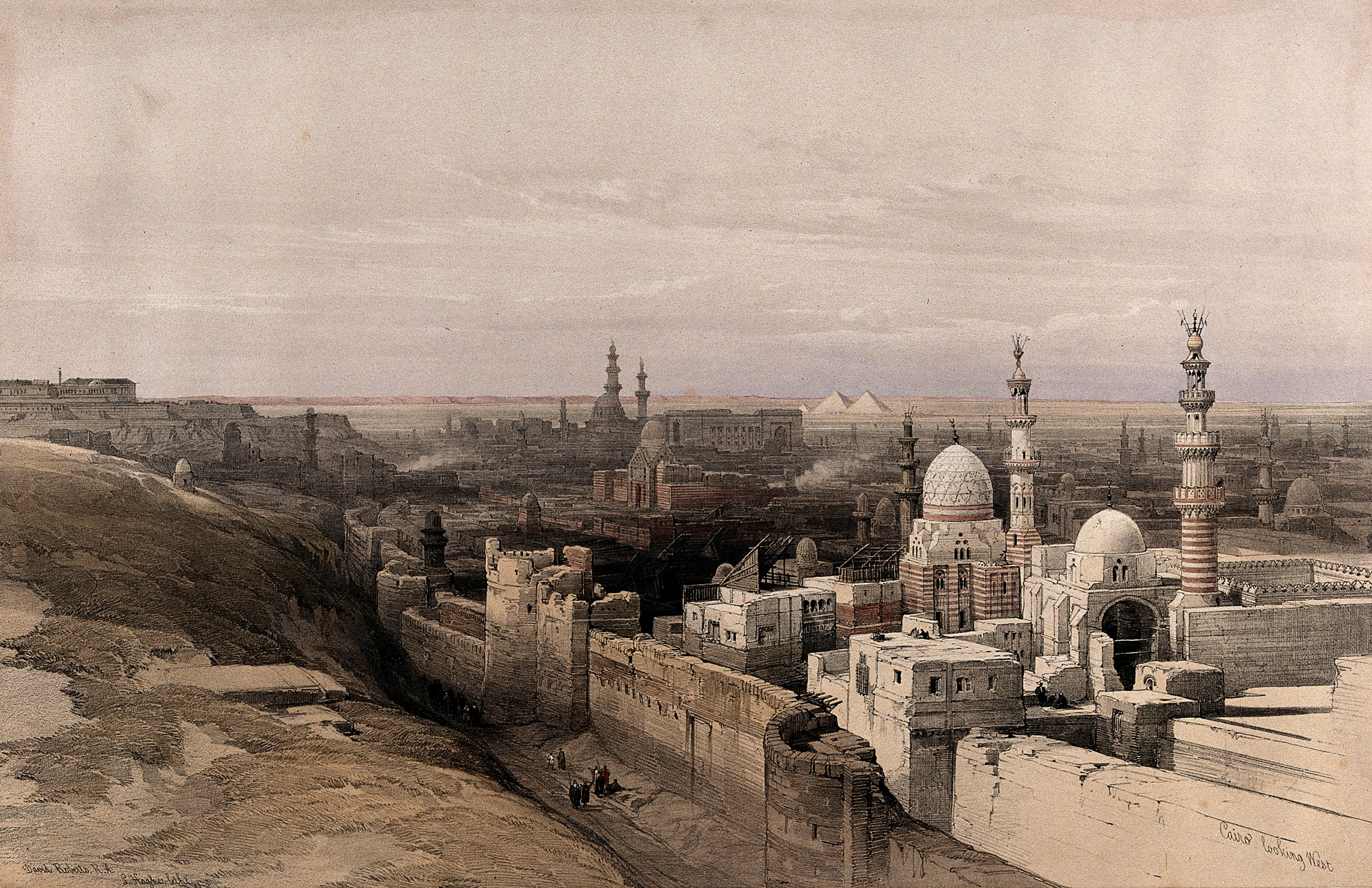
226. General view of Cairo from the West.

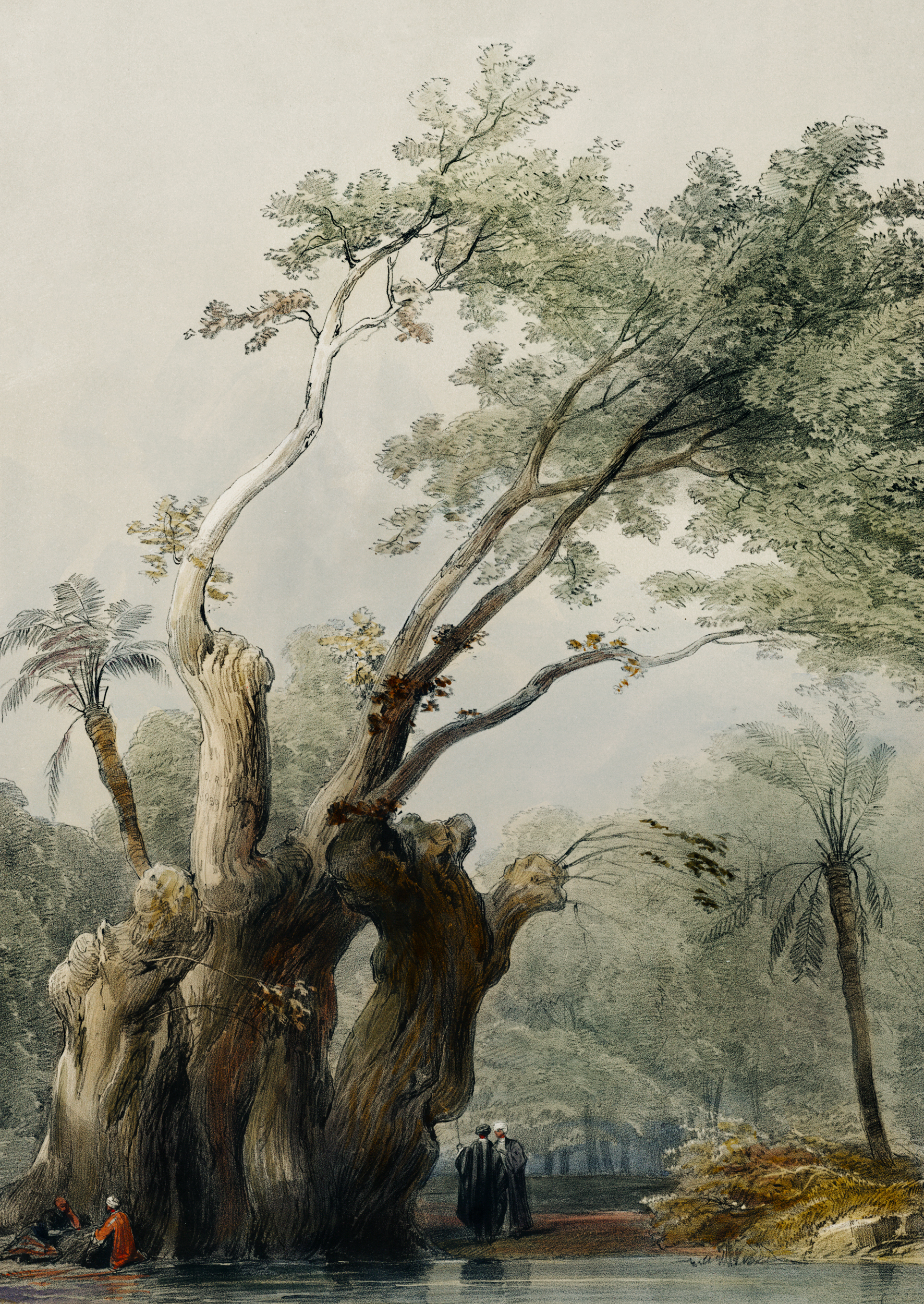
227. The Holy Tree of Metereeah.

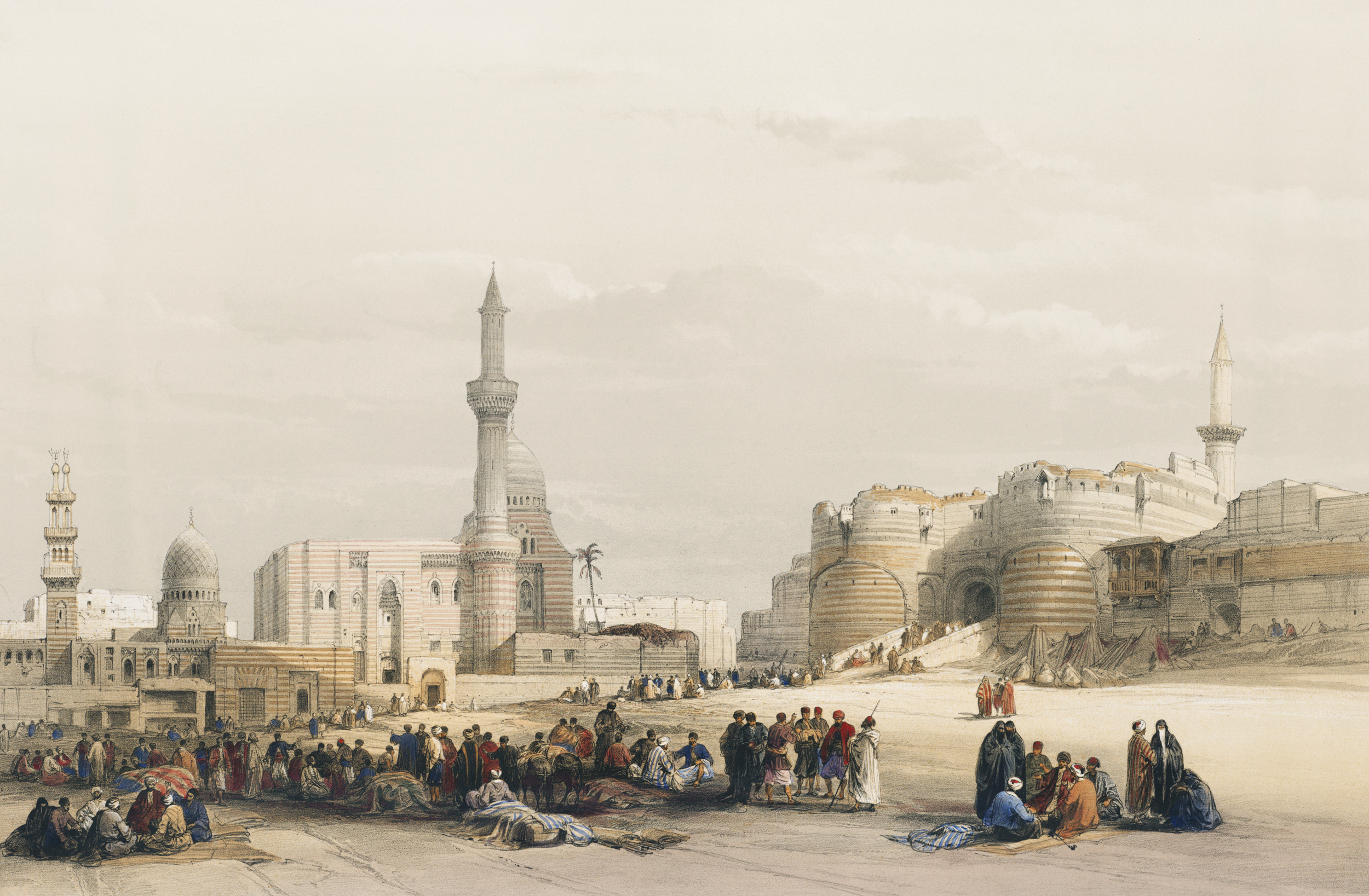
228. The entrance to the Citadel of Cairo.

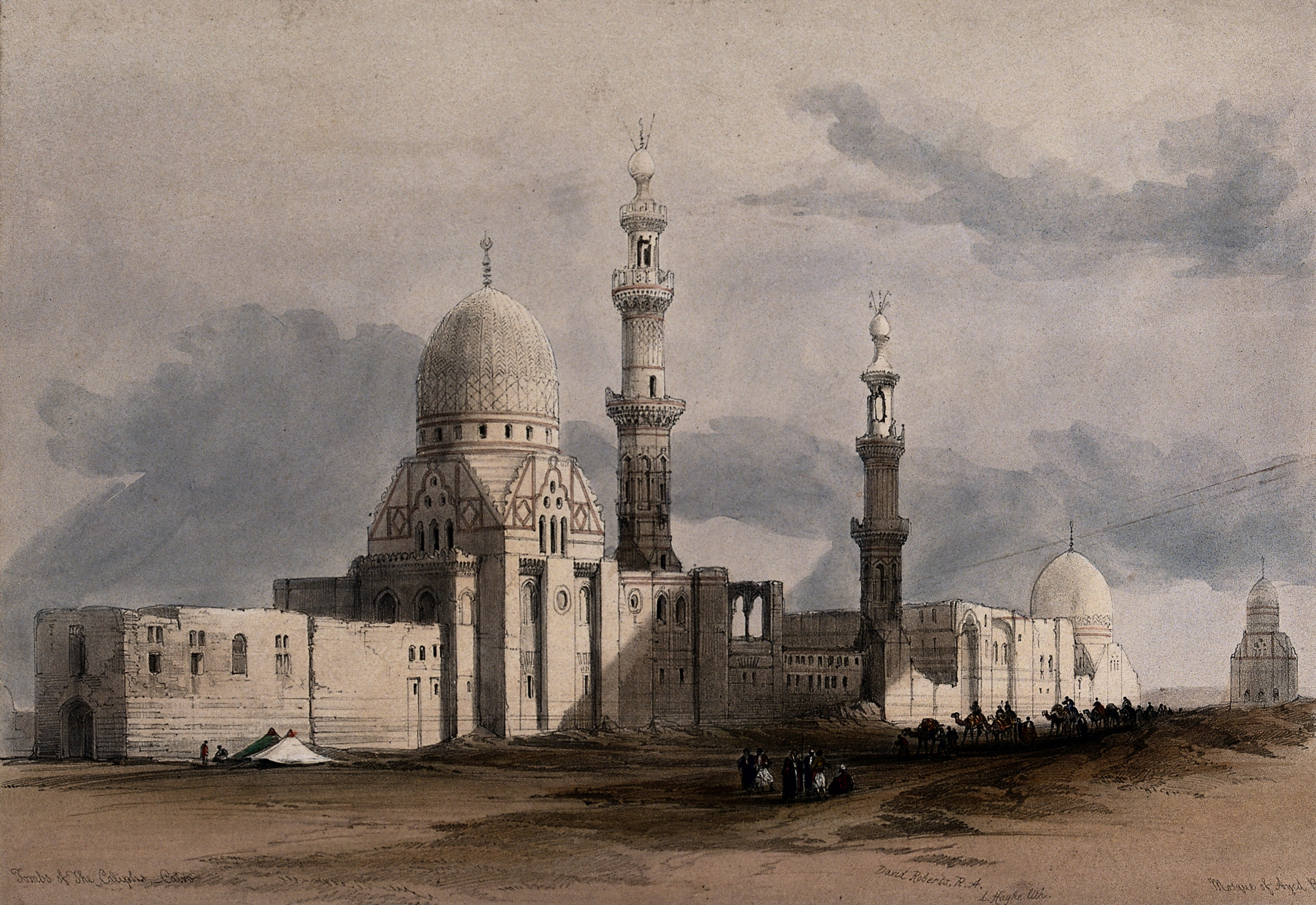
229. Mosque of Ayed Bey in the desert of Suez.

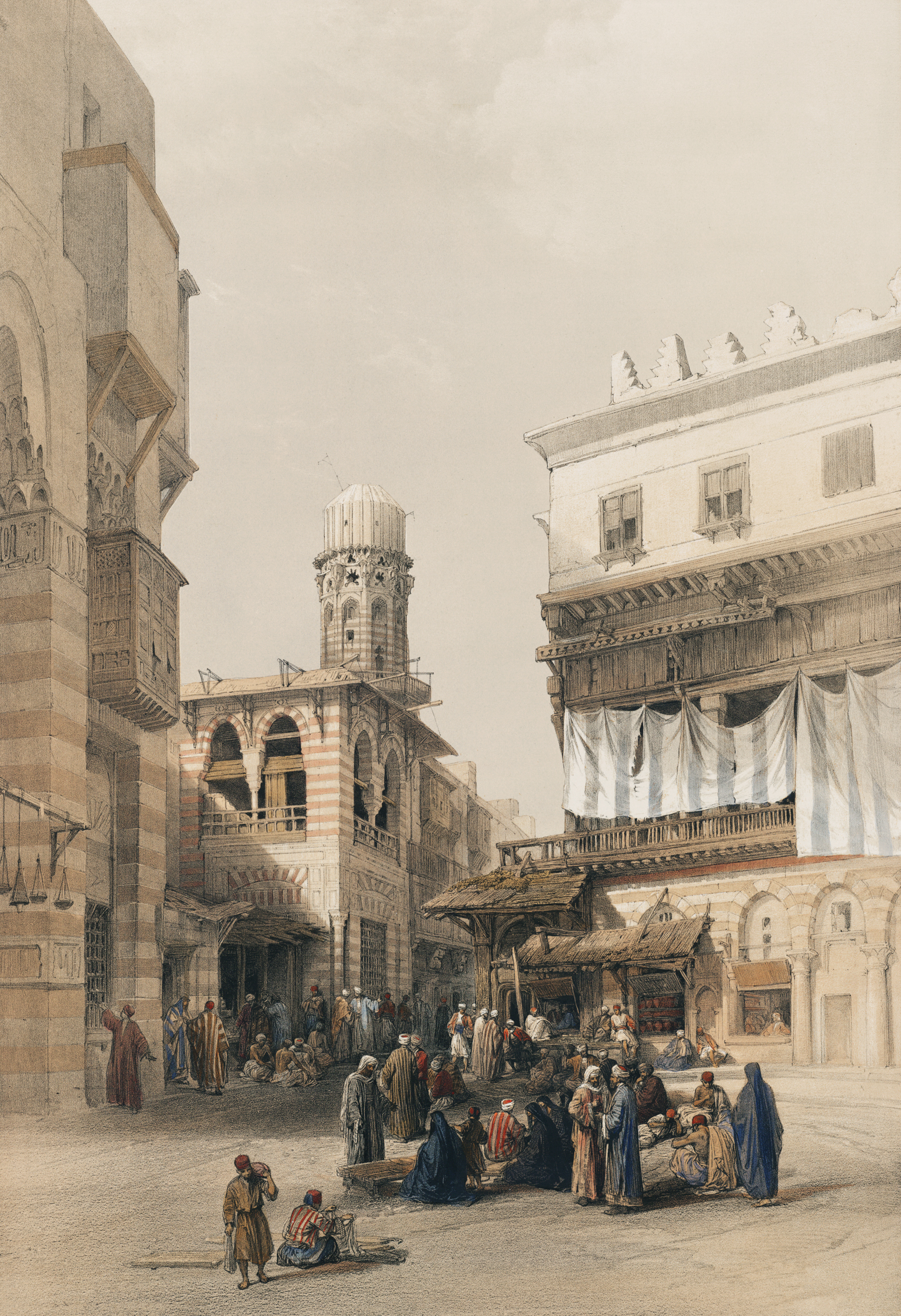
230. Bazaar of the Coppersmiths, Cairo.

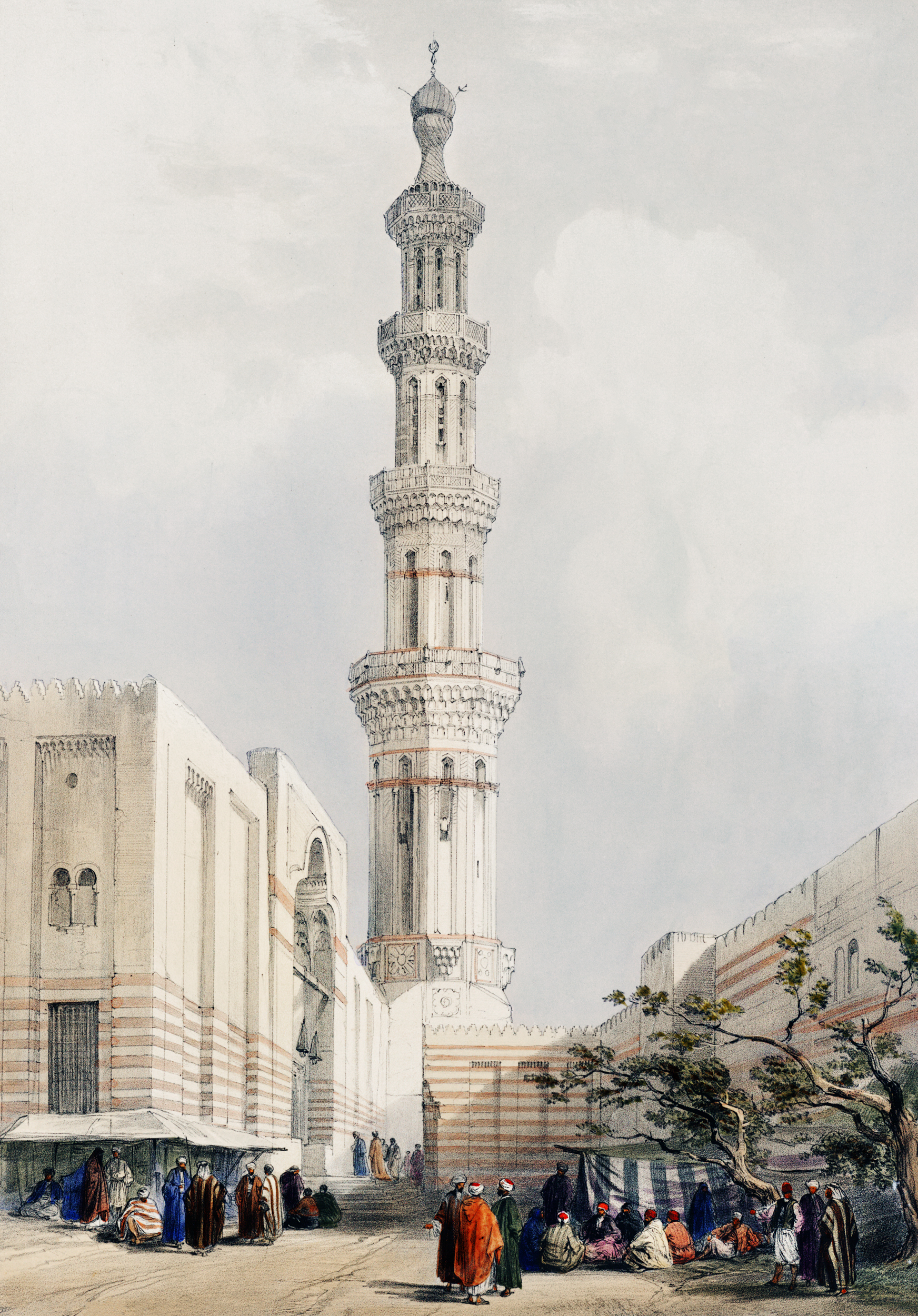
231. Minaret of the principal Mosque in Siout, Upper Egypt.

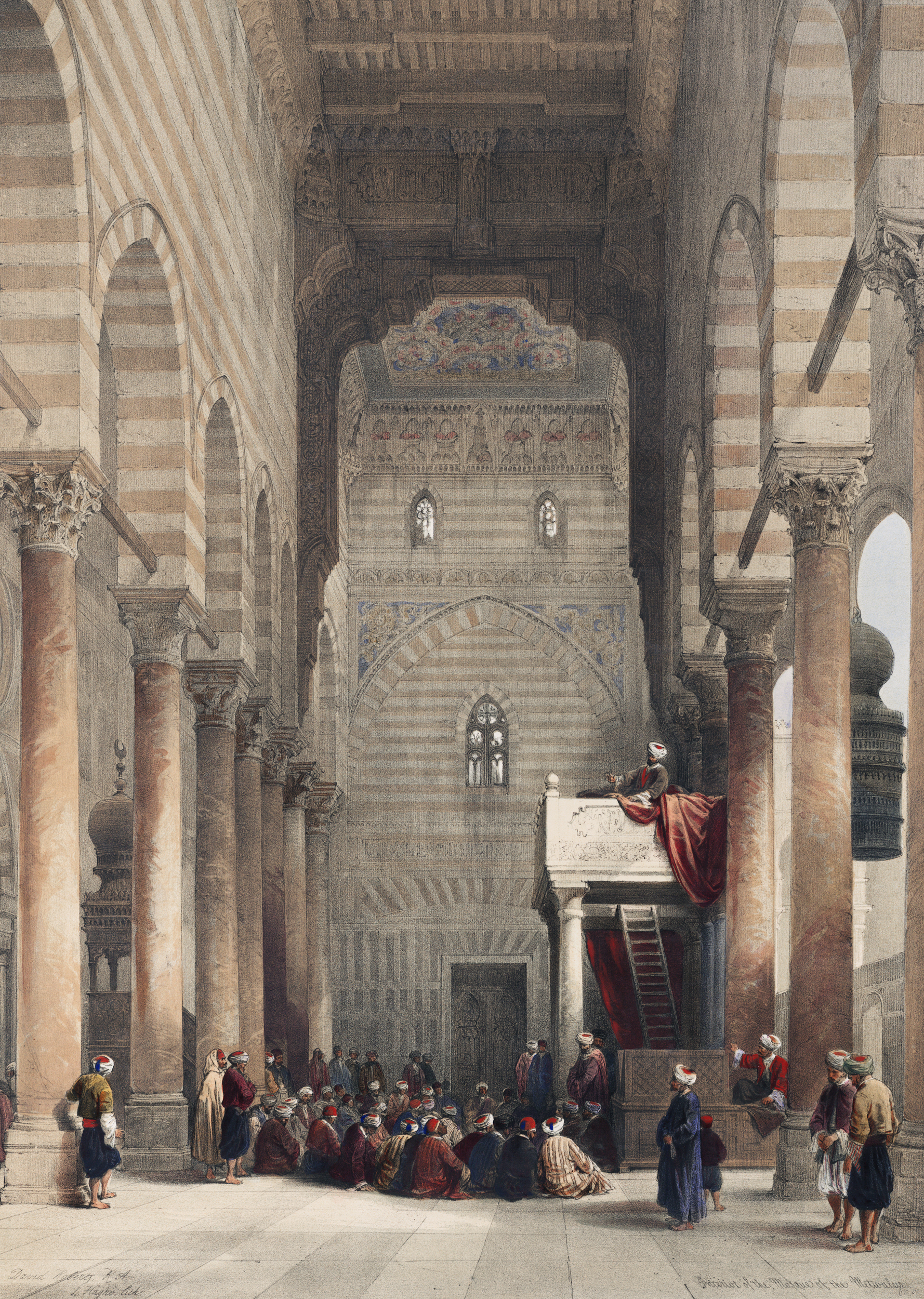
232. Interior of the Mosque of the Metwalis.

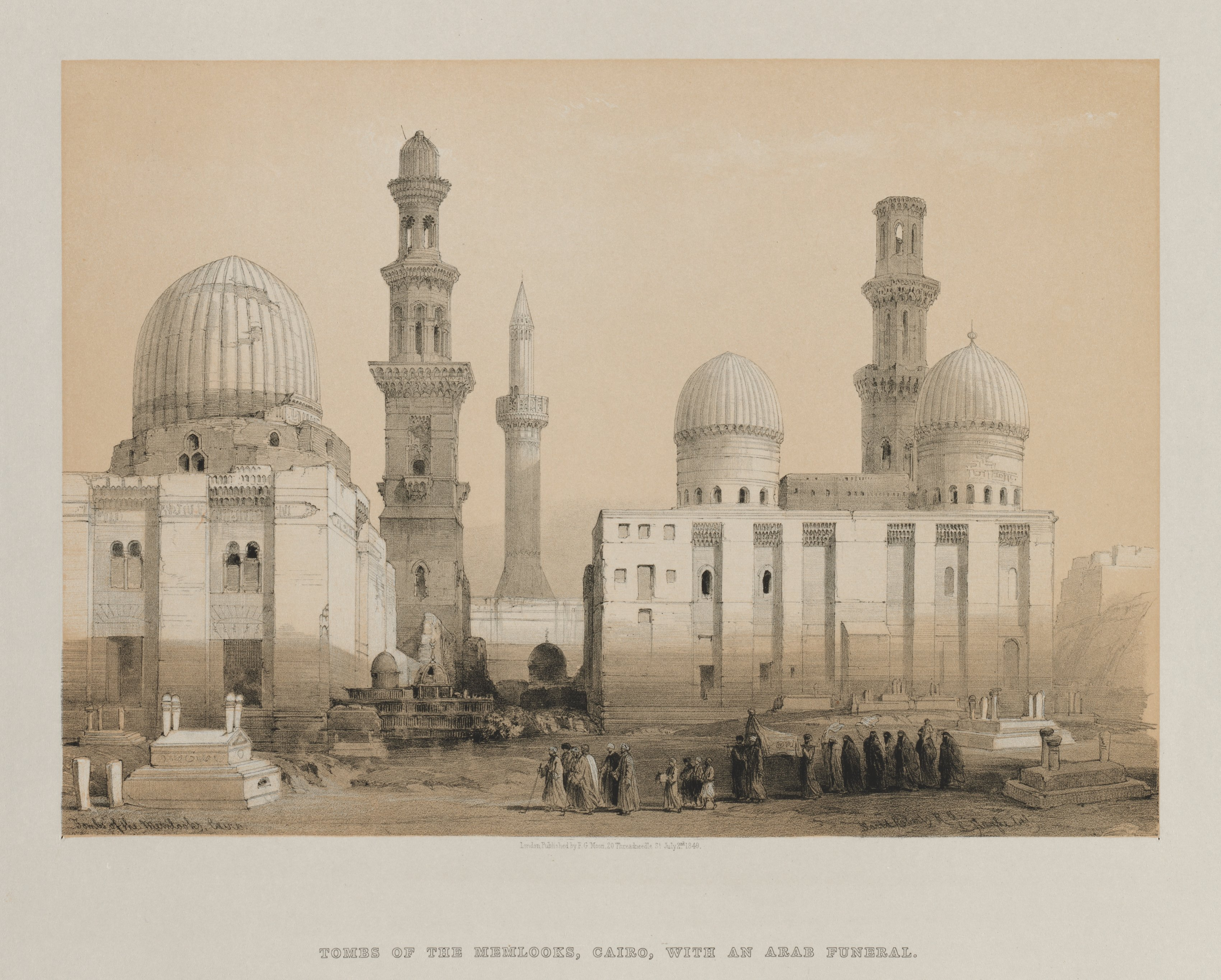
233. Tombs of the Memlooks, Cairo, with an Arab funeral.

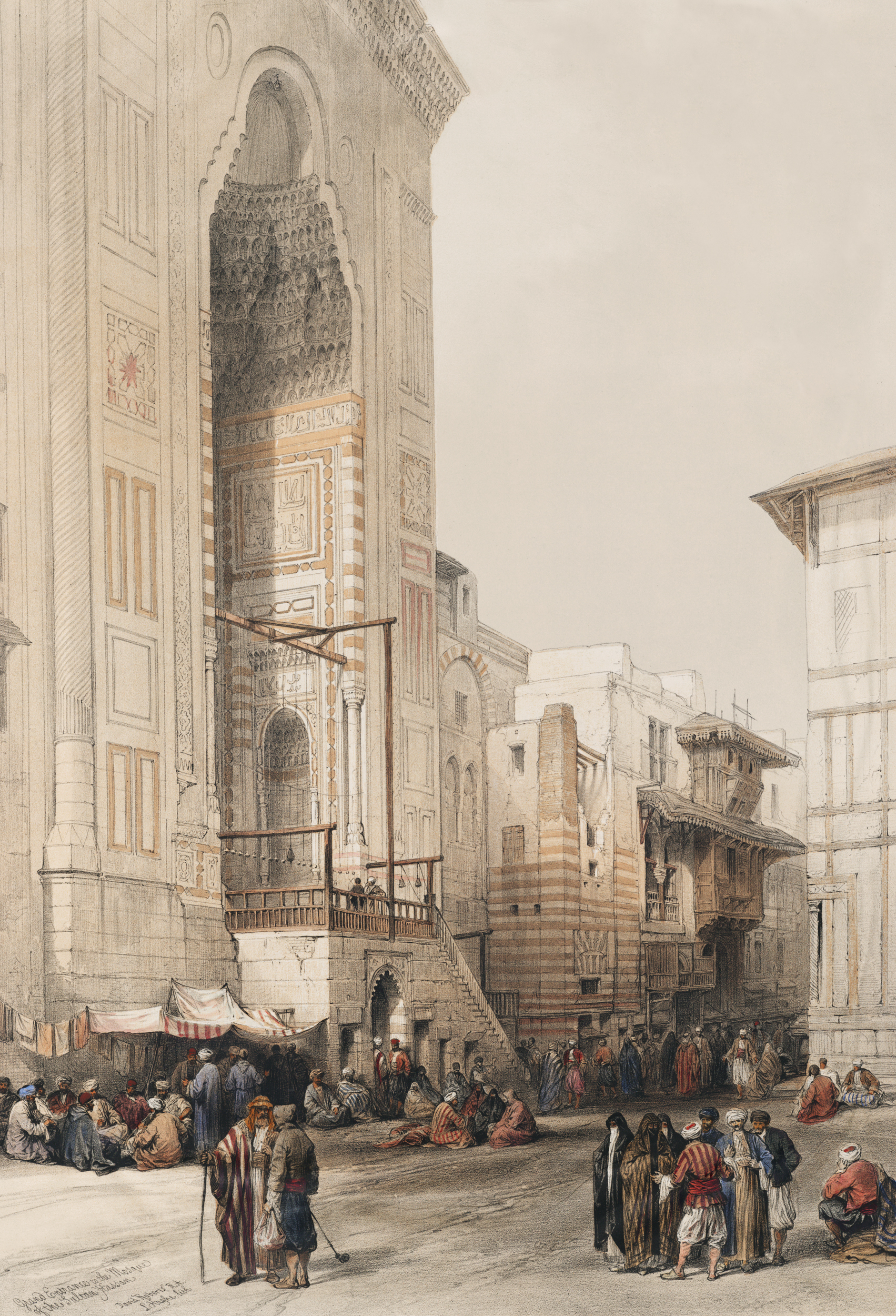
234. Grand entrance to the Mosque of the Sultan Hassan.

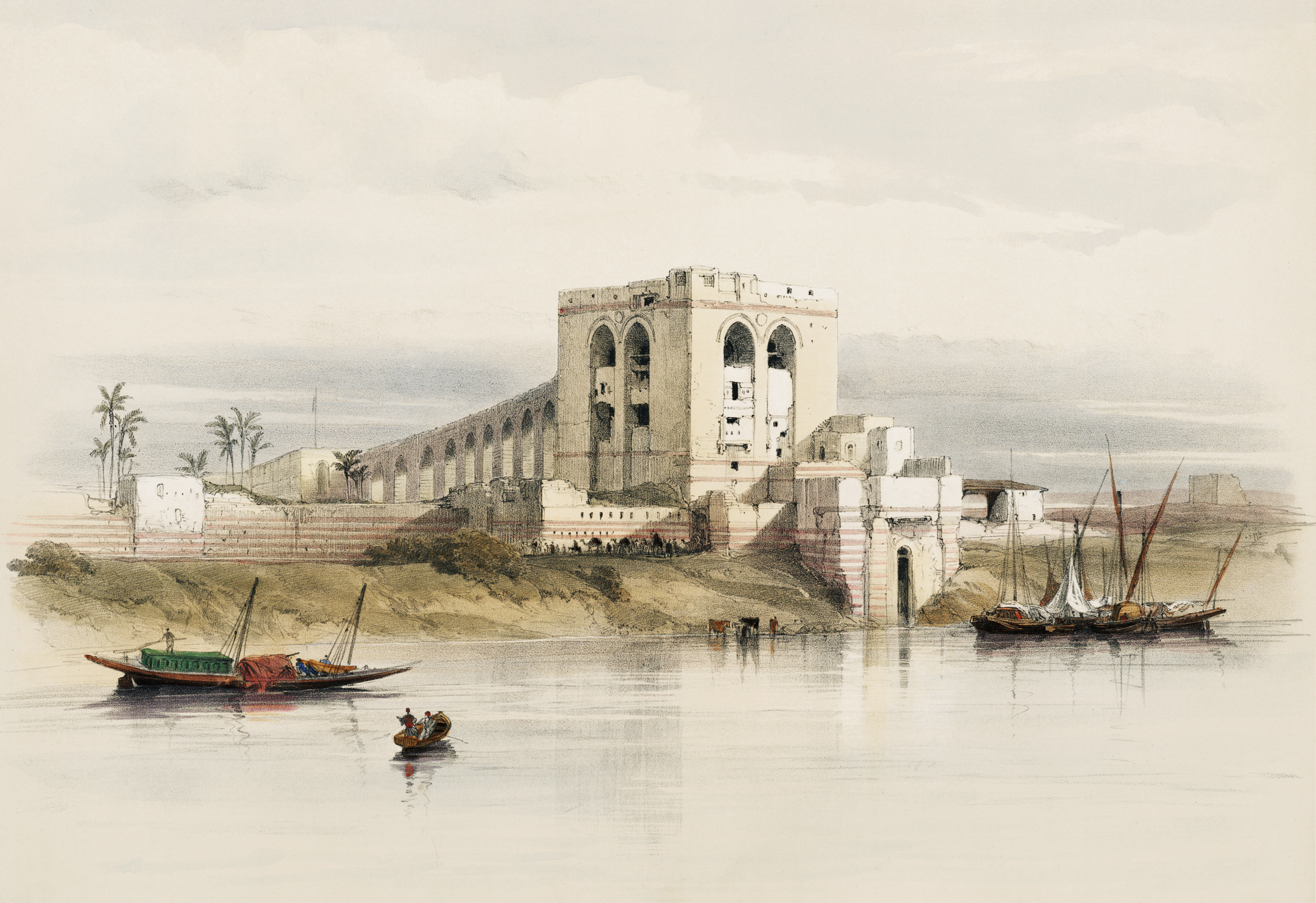
235. Cairo, the aqueduct of the Nile, from the Island of Rhoda.

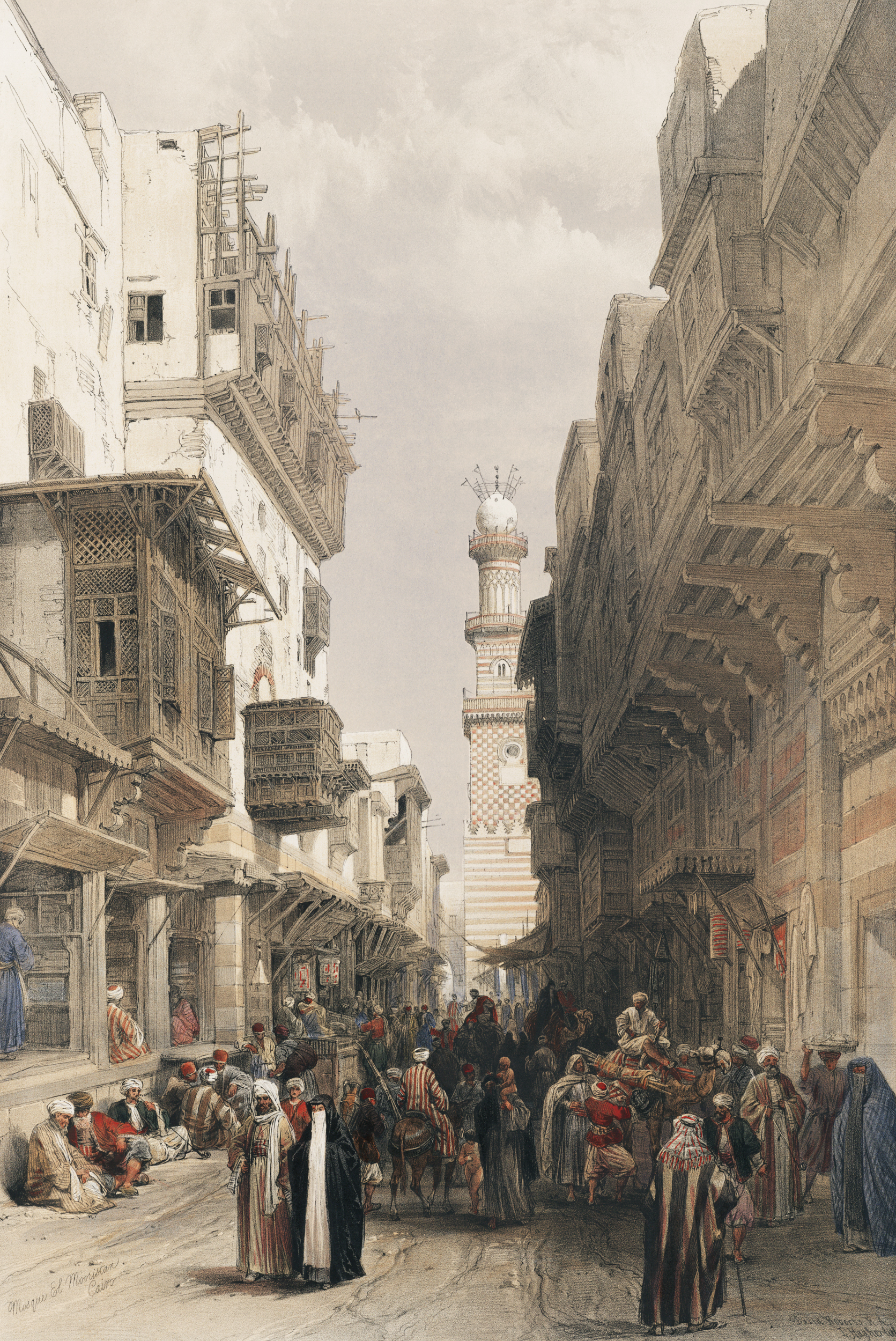
236. Bazaar of the street leading to the Mosque El-Mooristan, Cairo.

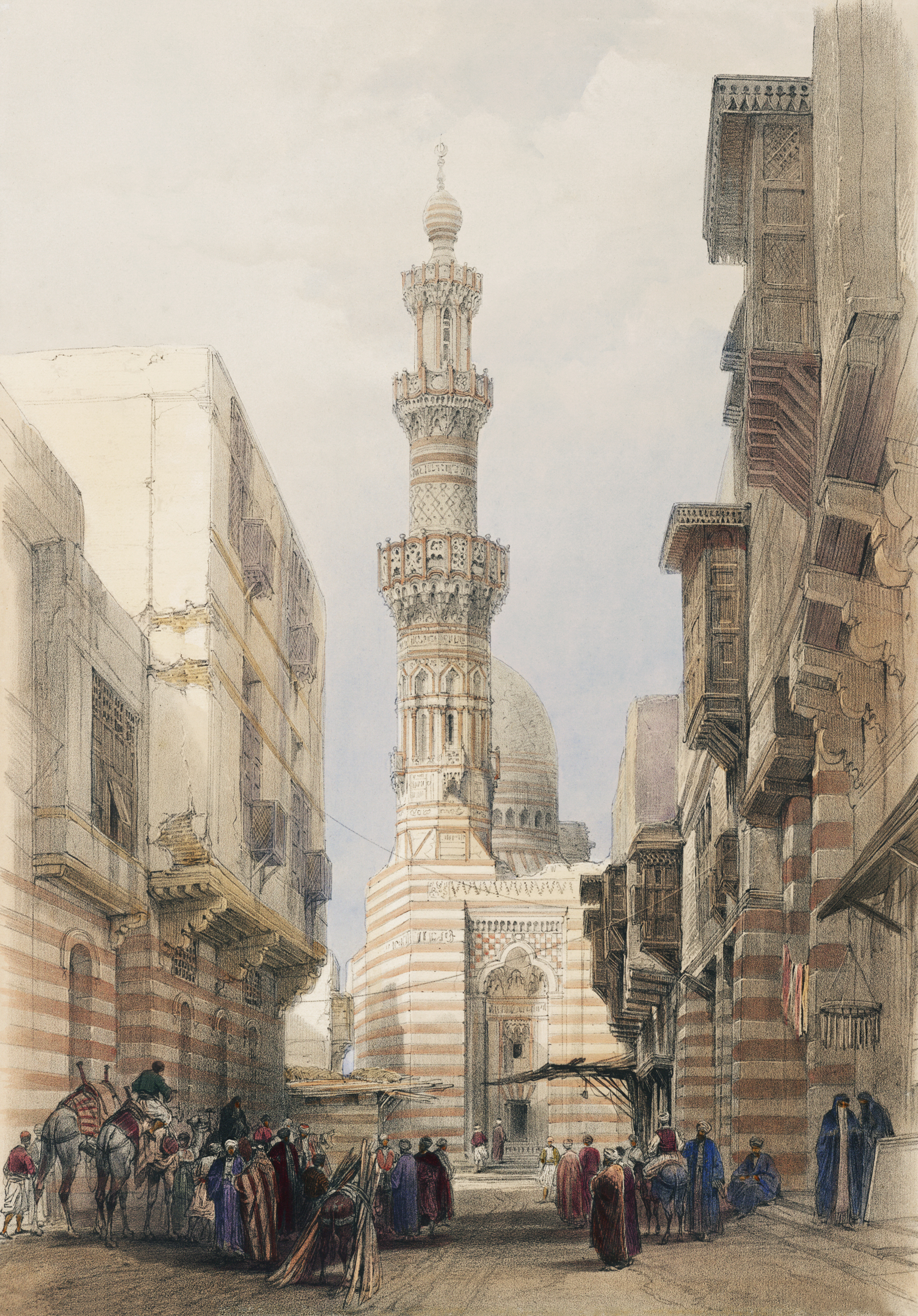
237. Principal Mosque at Boulak.

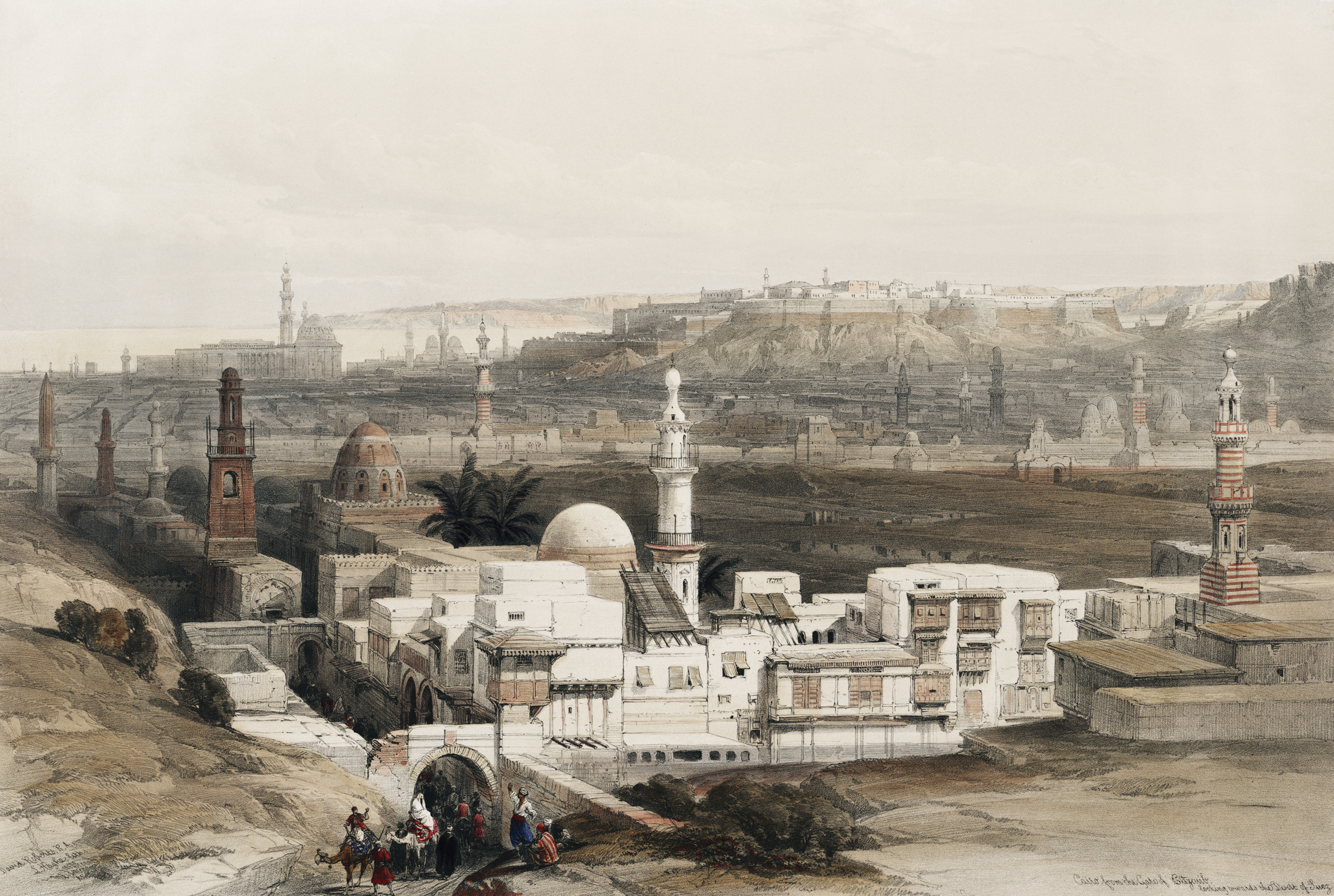
238. Cairo, from the gate of the Citizenib, looking towards the desert of Suez.

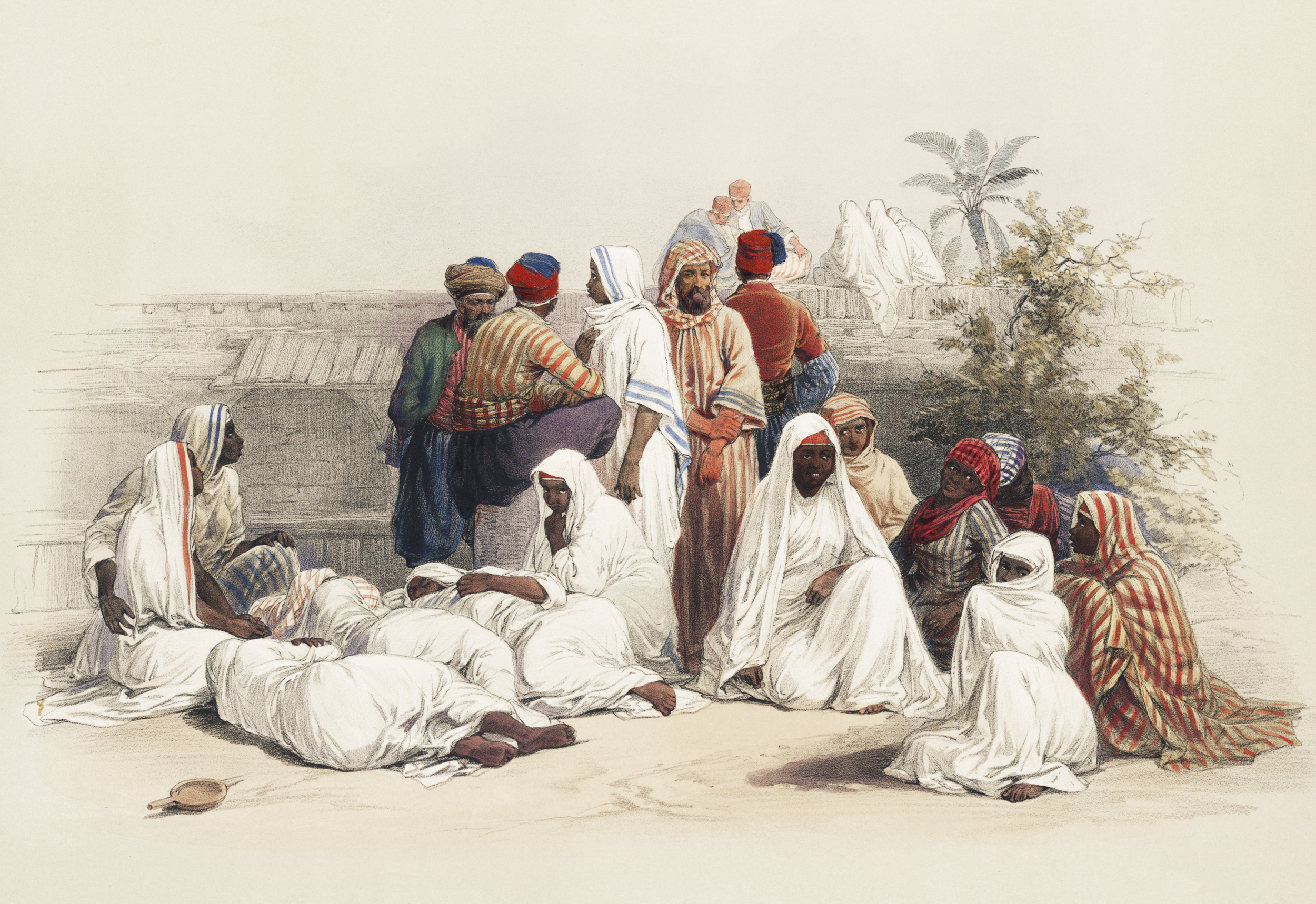
239. A group in the Slave Market of Cairo.

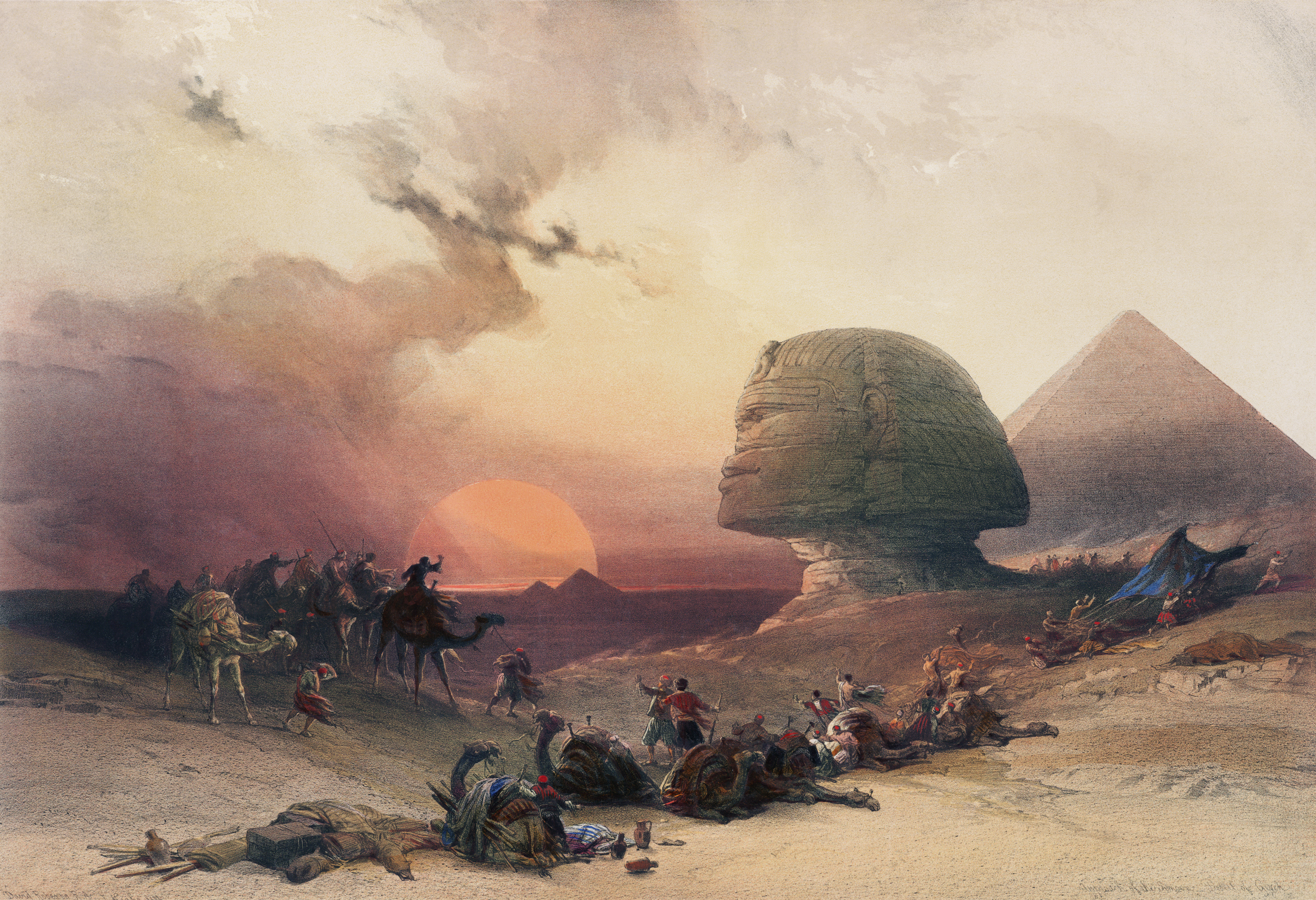
240. The Simoom in the desert.

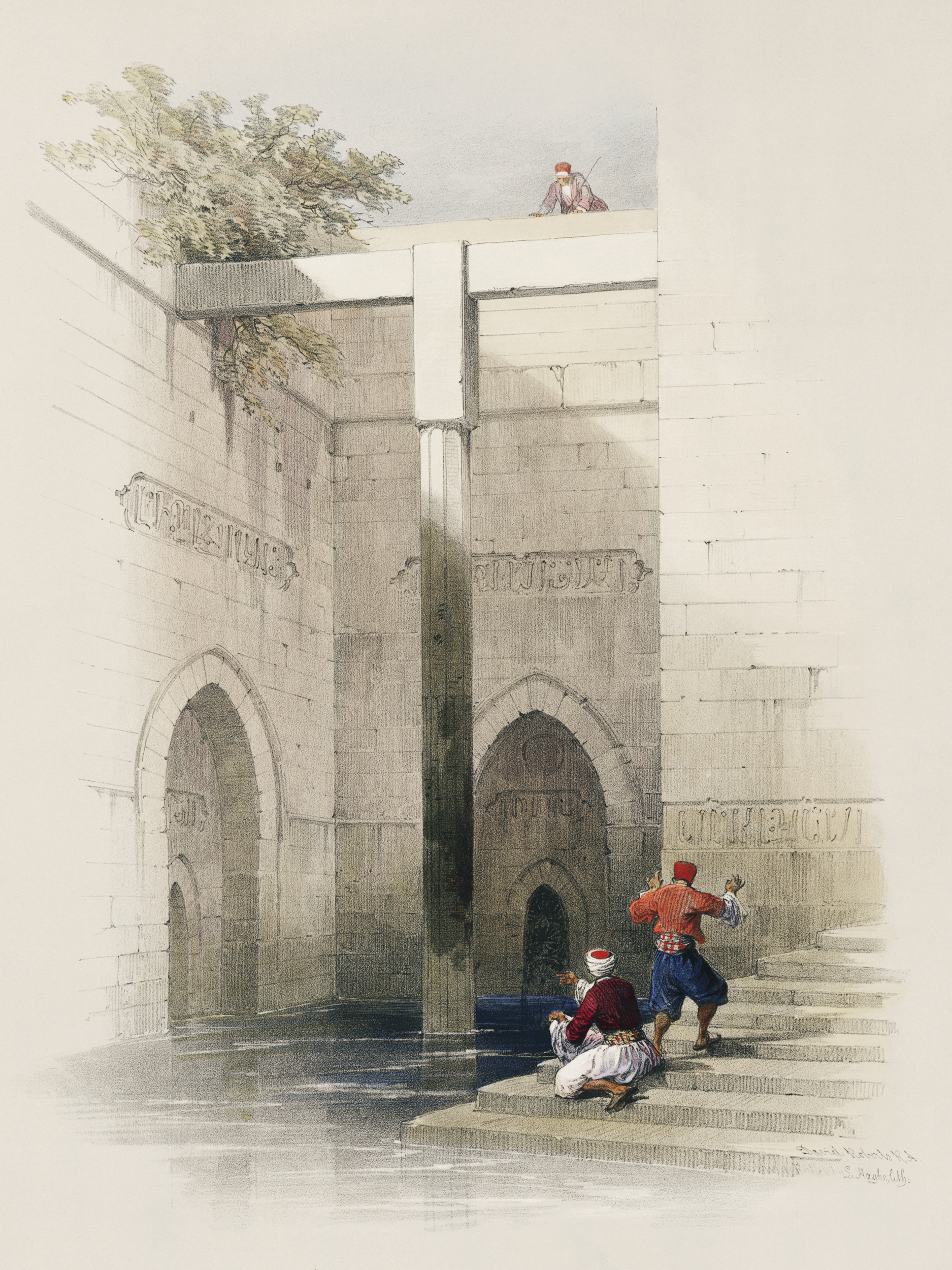
241. The Nilometer on the Island of Rhoda, Cairo.

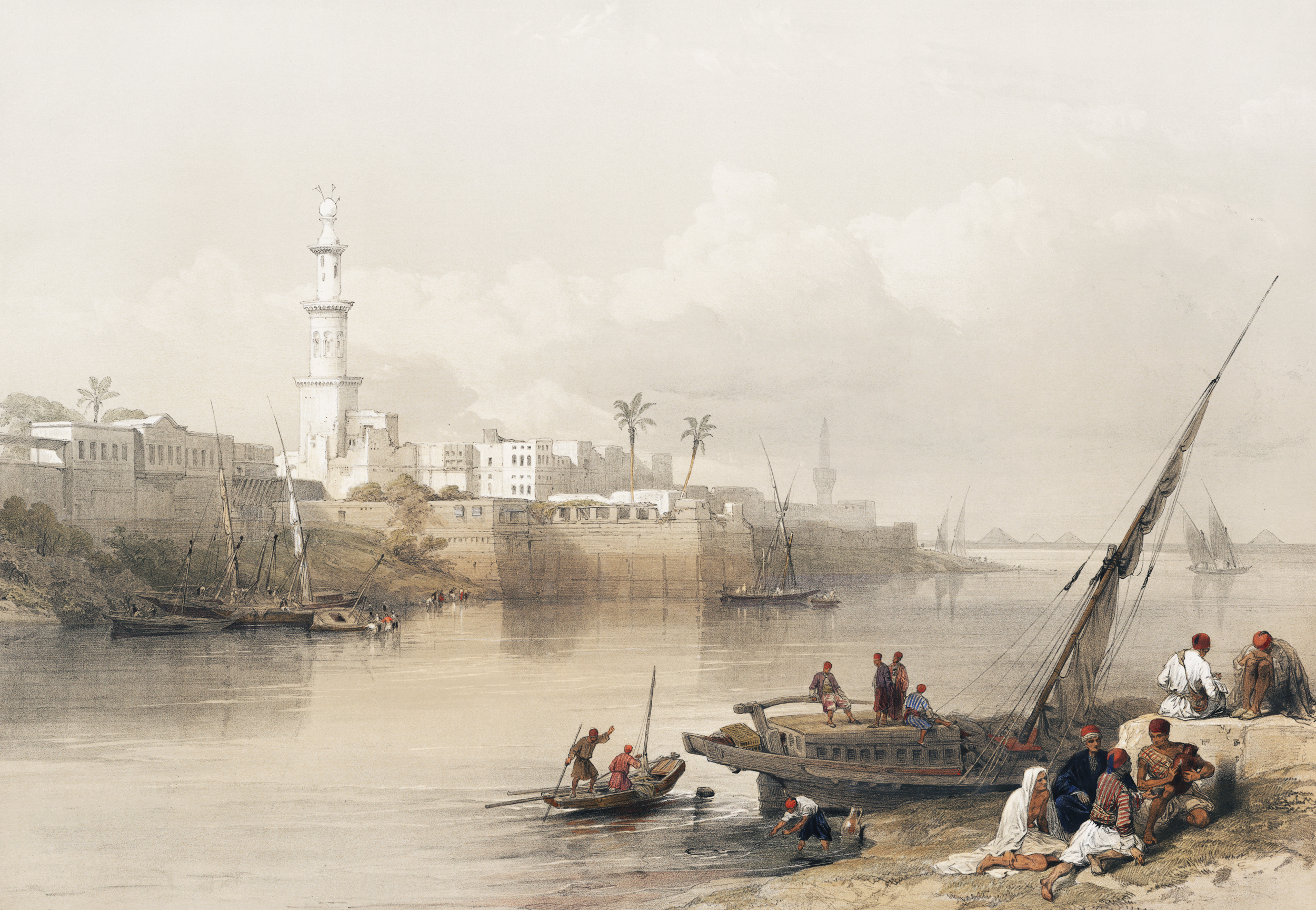
242. View on the Nile, Isle of Rhoda, and Ferry of Gheezeh.

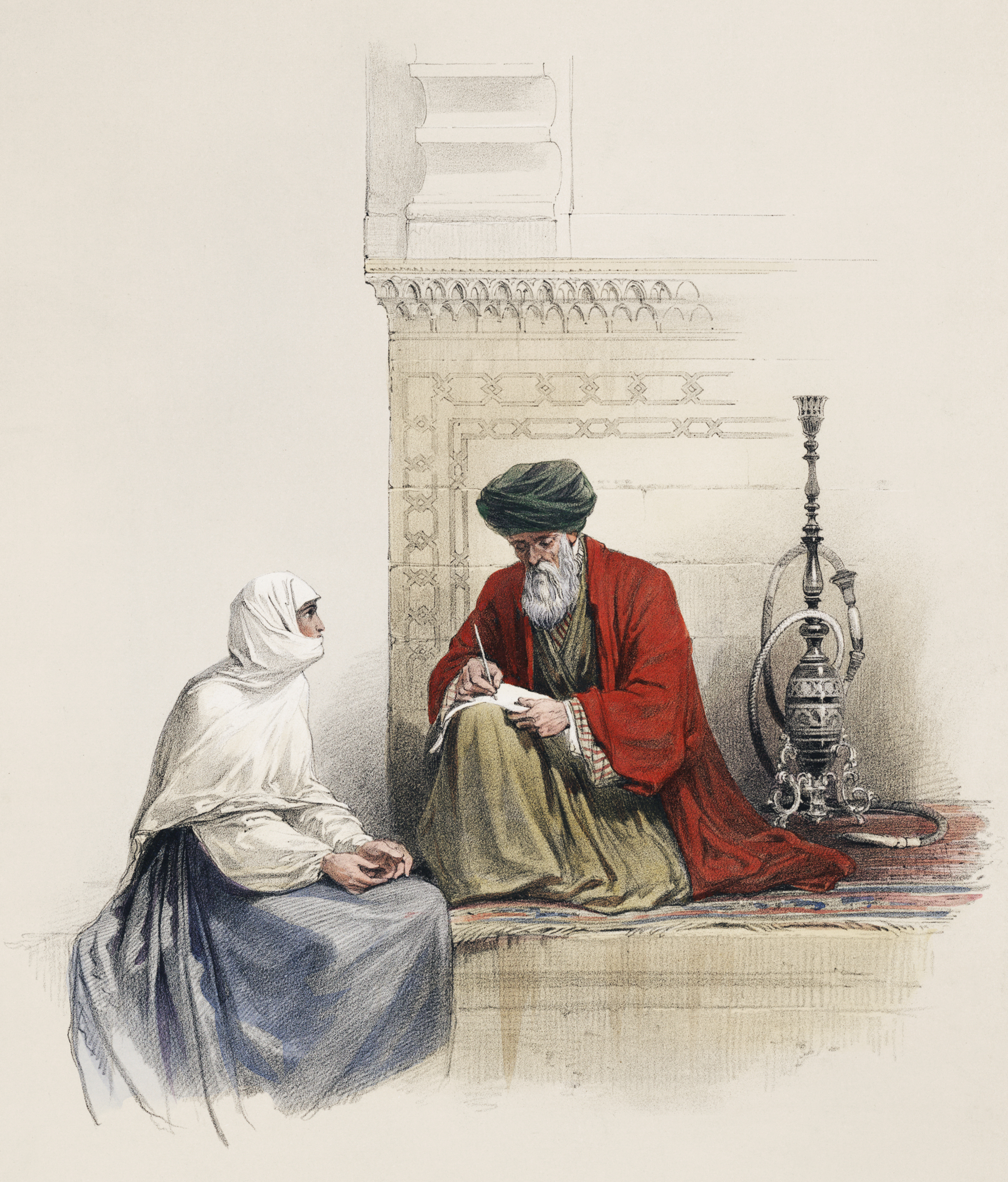
243. The Letter Writer, Cairo.

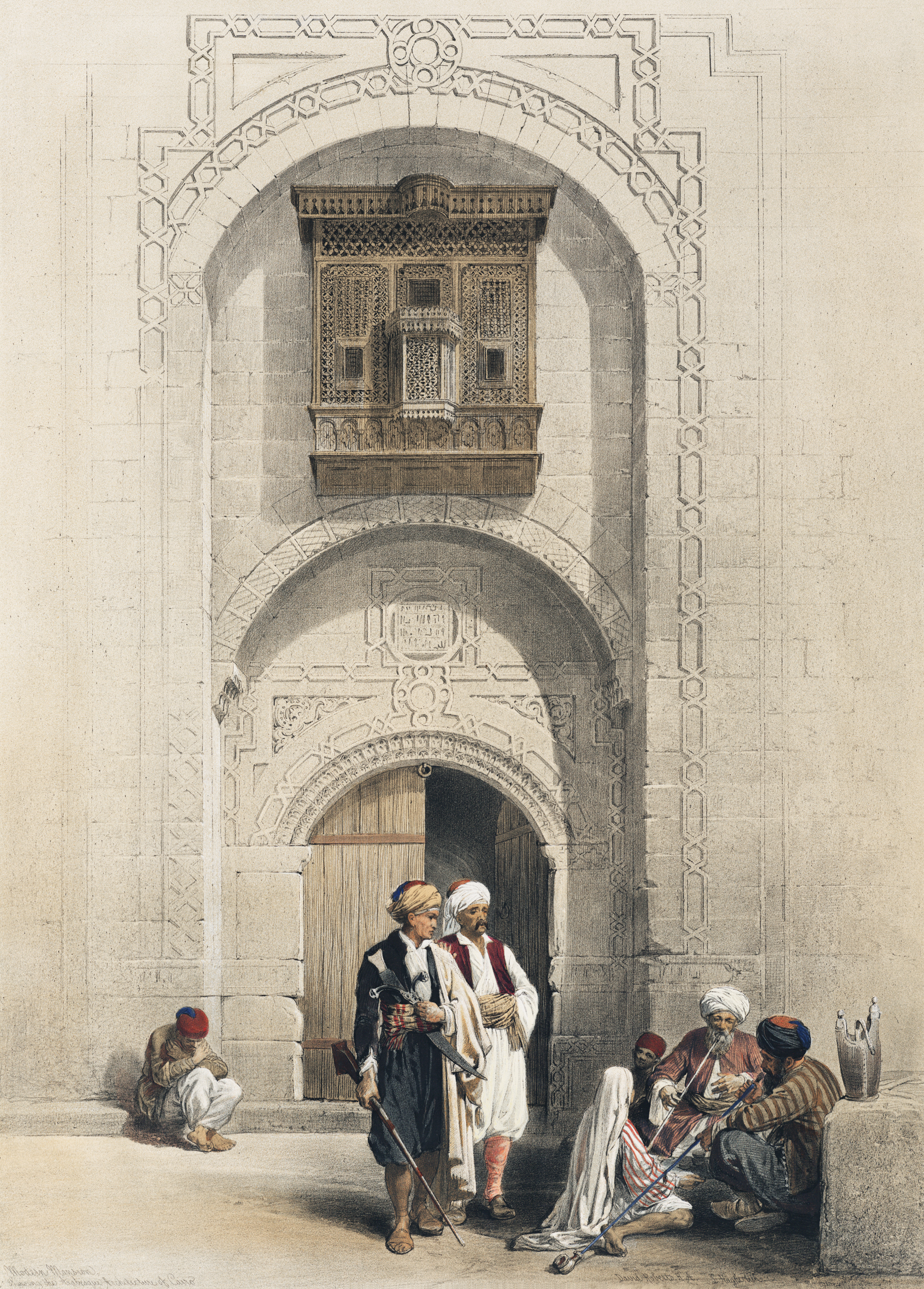
244. Entrance to a private mansion, Cairo.

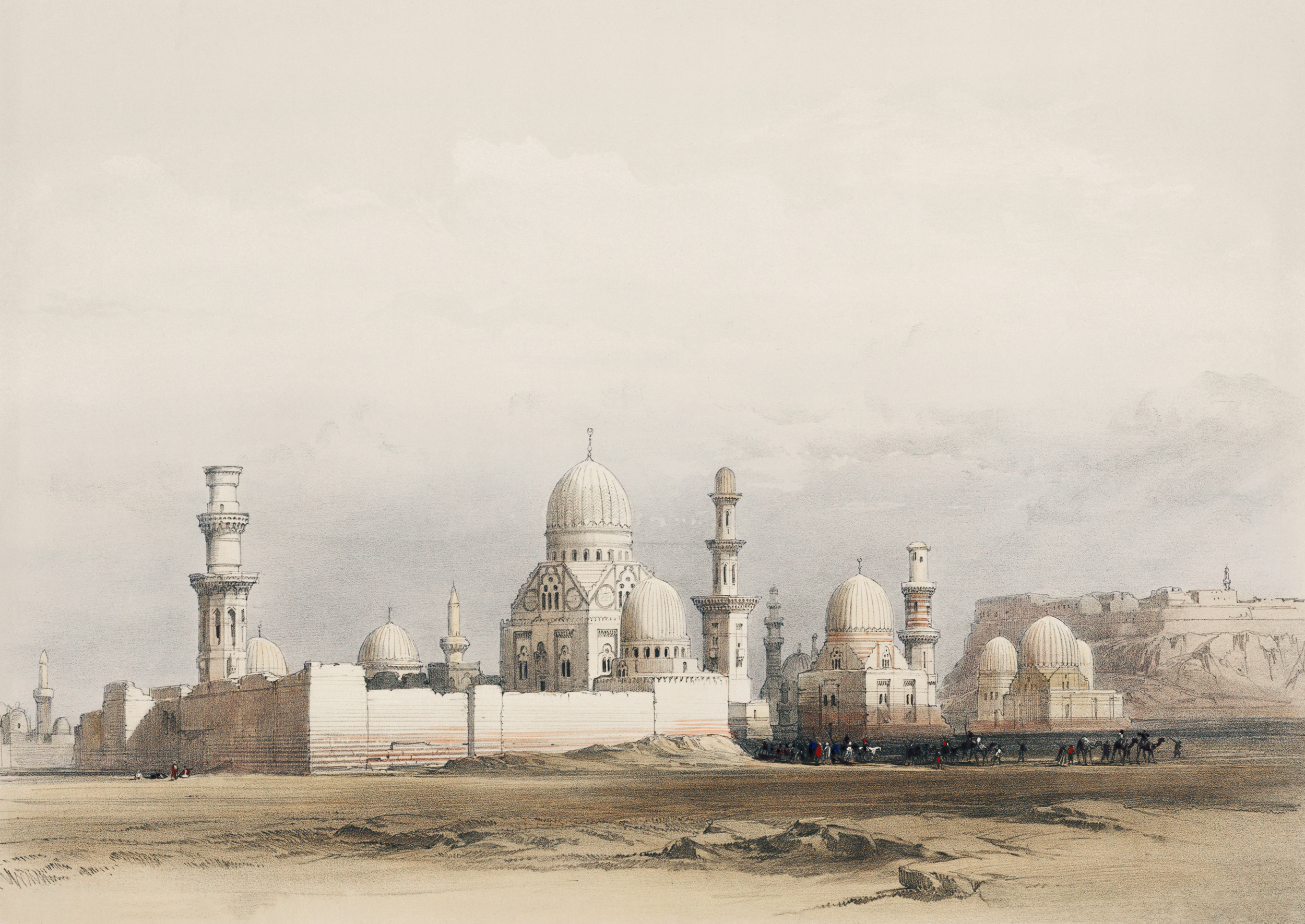
245. Tombs of the Memlooks, Cairo.

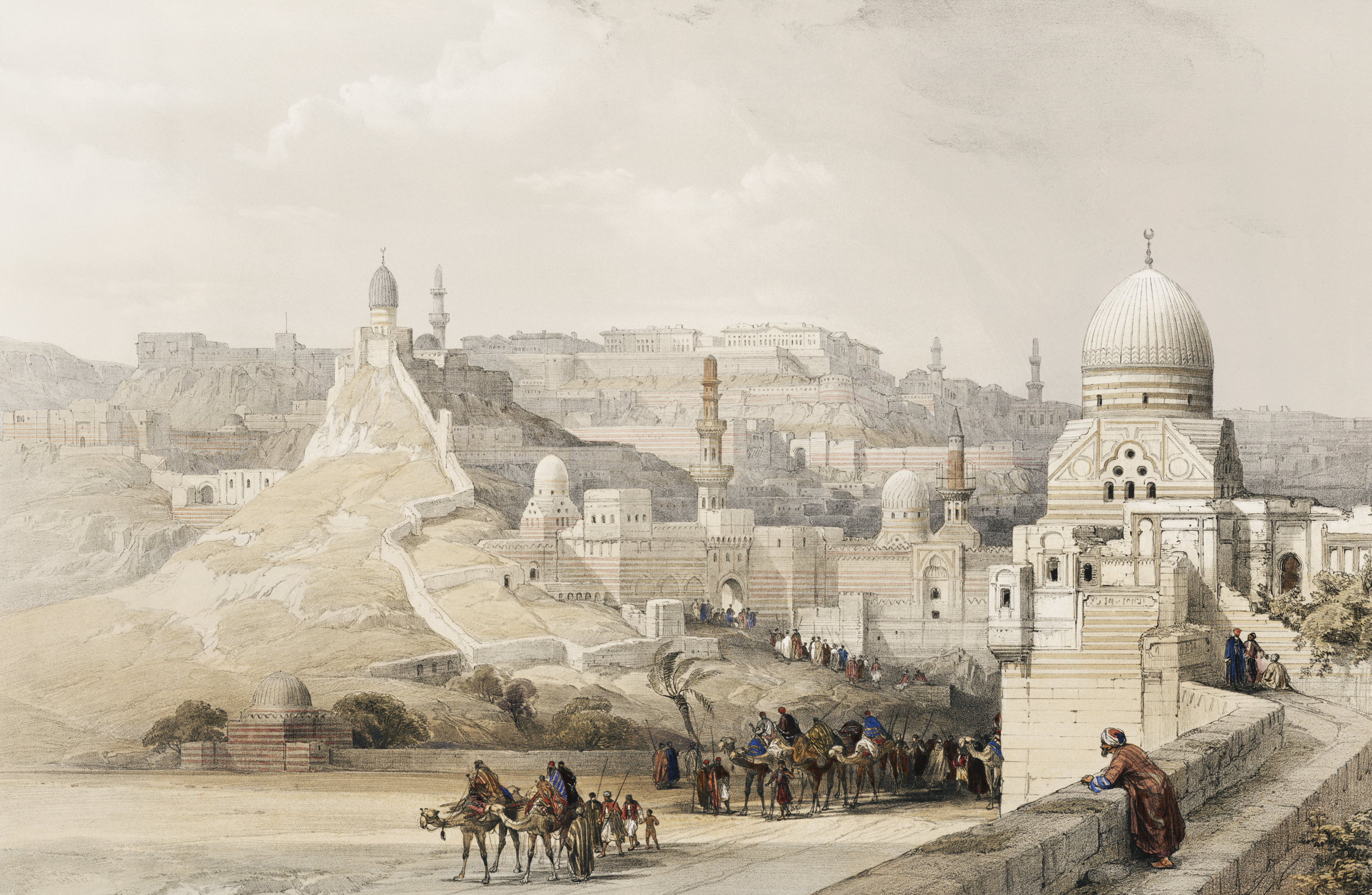
246. Citadel of Cairo, the residence of the Pashia.

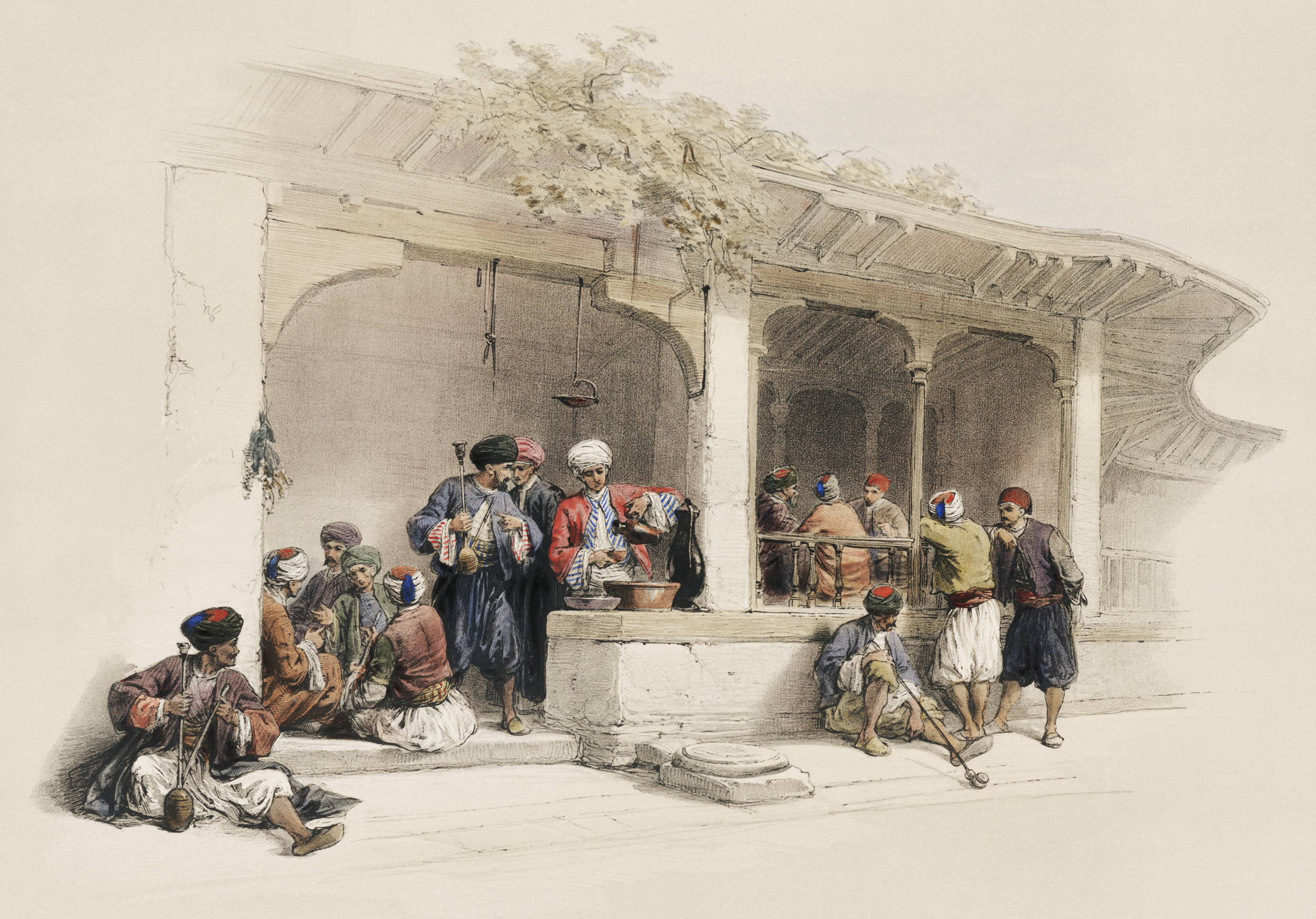
247. The Coffee Shop of Cairo.

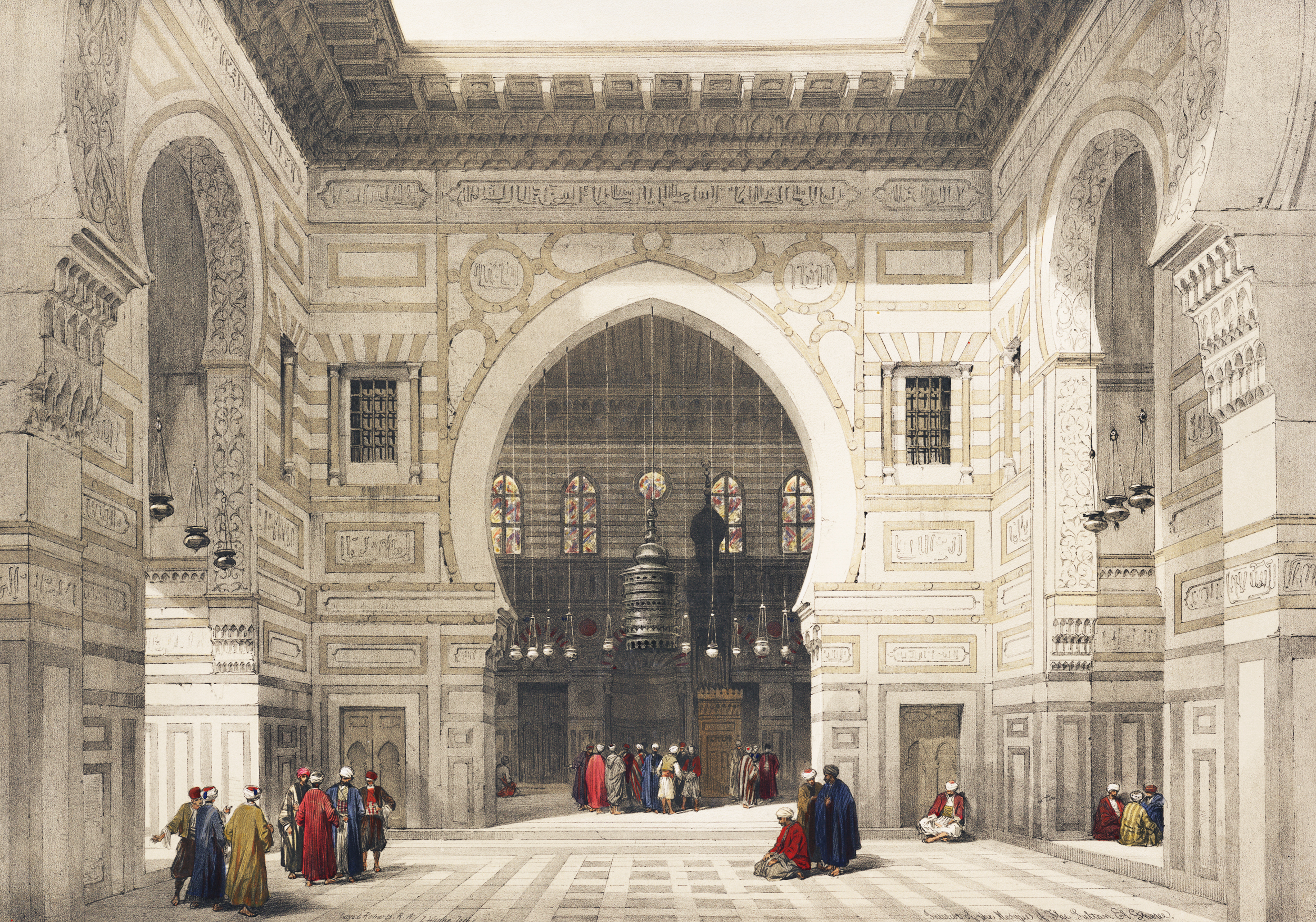
248. Interior of the Mosque of the Sultan El-Ghoree.

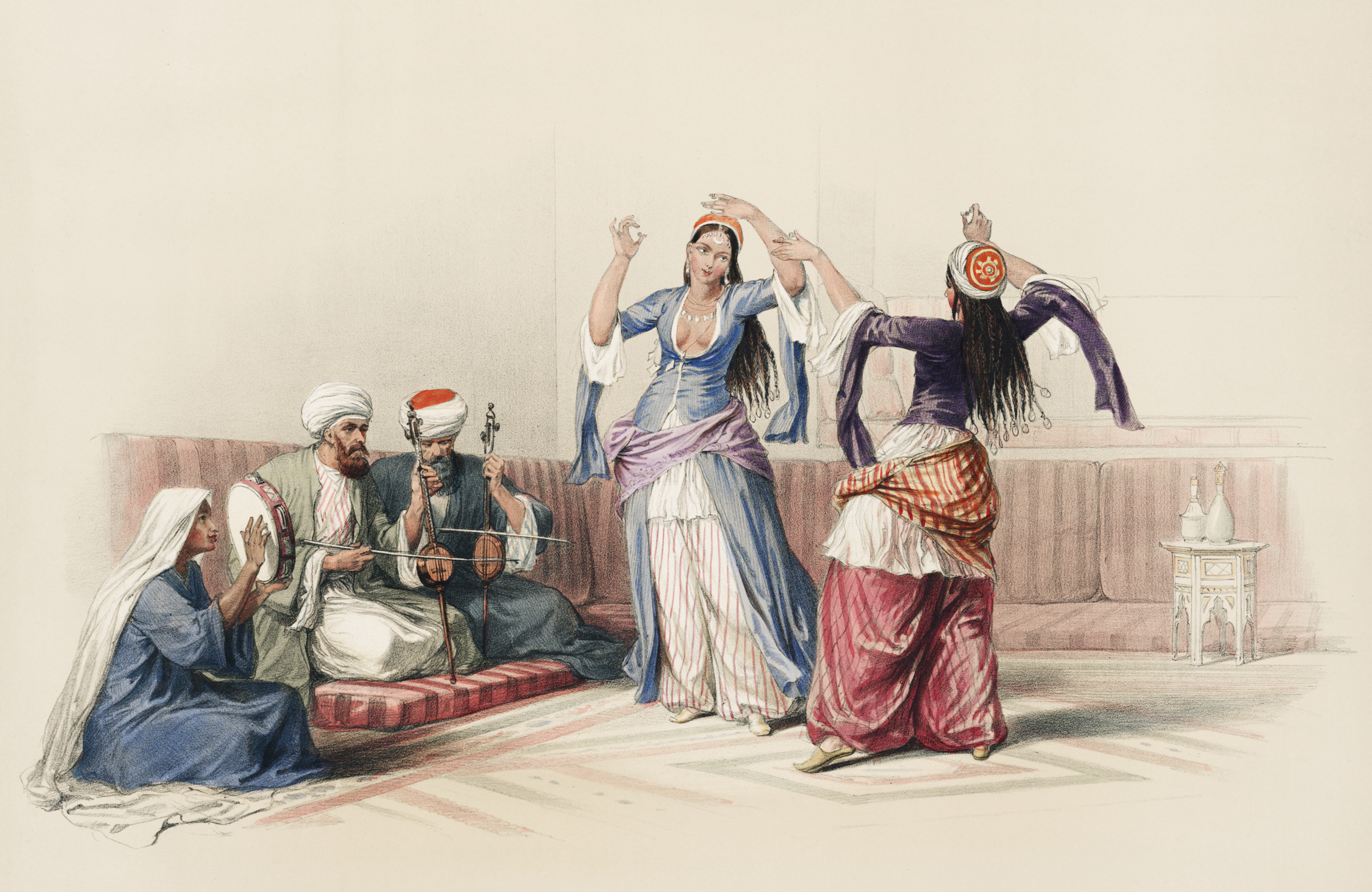
249. The Ghawazees, or Dancing-Girls of Cairo.

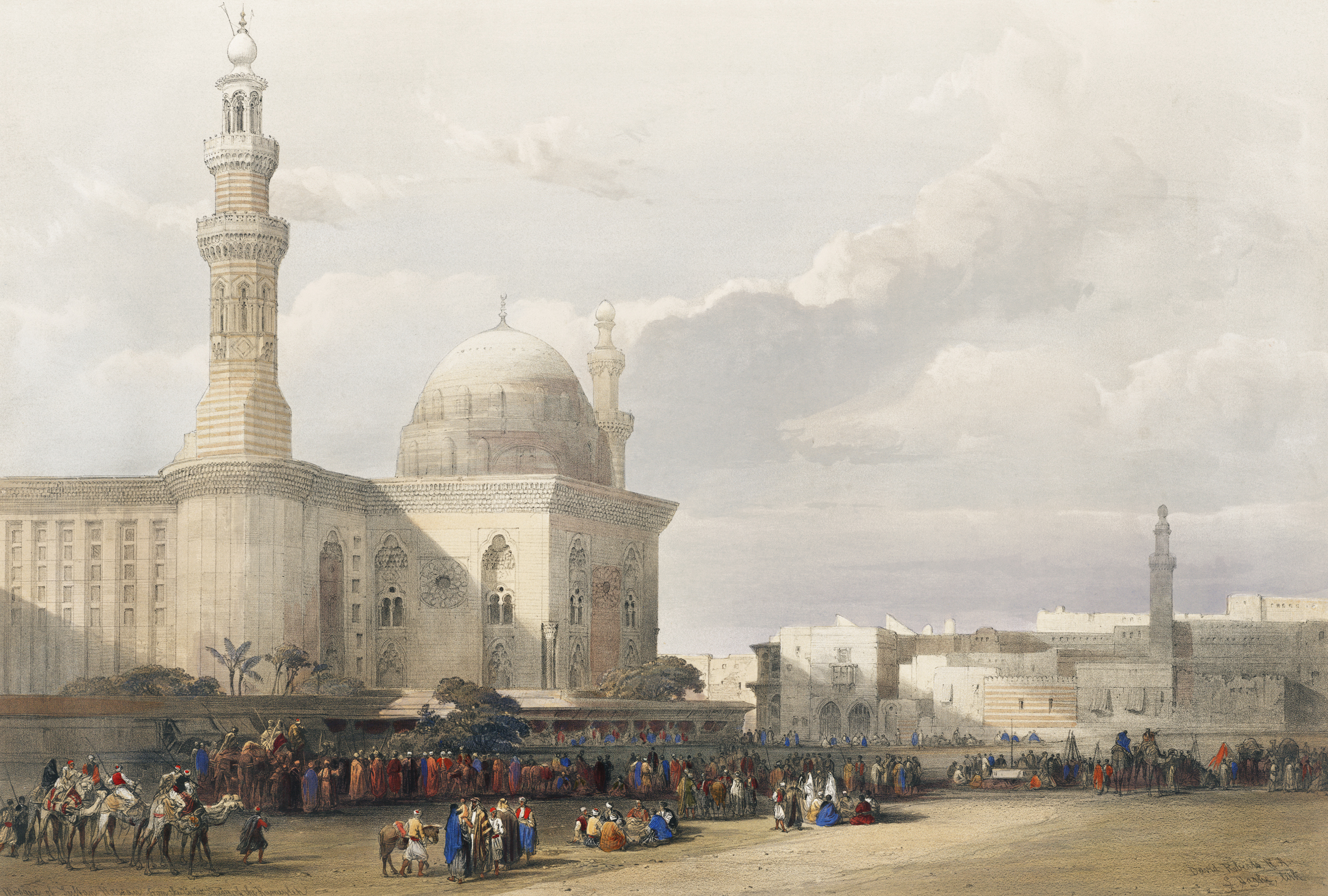
250. Mosque of the Sultan Hassan, from the Great Square of the Rumeyleh.

== Criticism of orientalism ==
The images have been widely criticized as providing an orientalist perspective on the region. Uzi Baram wrote: "From Said's critique of Orientalism, it is clear that Roberts created picturesque landscapes that embodied British concerns and imagery, landscapes that were translated for the Western gaze. Roberts did not simply capture the landscapes of Palestine; similar to the other Orientalists, he fashioned an image of the Holy Land rather than representing all that he saw."

Meyers states that Roberts was "orientalizing the picturesque ideal in a Levantine setting", and Proctor writes that the images were not an accurate representation but rather a figment of the Western imagination. Bendiner proposed multiple influences underlying Roberts's orientalist style, including his social conscience, opulent taste, self-confidence, sense of history, contemporary international rivalries, and the religious questions of the day.

== Bibliography ==
- Baram, Uzi (2007). "Images of the Holy Land: The David Roberts paintings as artifacts of 1830s Palestine". Historical Archaeology. 41 (1): 106–117. doi:10.1007/BF03376997. JSTOR 25617429. S2CID 164696852.
- Bendiner, Kenneth (1983). "David Roberts in the Near East: Social and religious themes". Art History. 6 (1): 67–81. doi:10.1111/j.1467-8365.1983.tb00794.x.
- Chander, Manu Samriti (2011). "Framing difference: the orientalist aesthetics of David Roberts and Percy Shelley". Keats-Shelley Journal. 60: 77–94. JSTOR 41409556.
- Meyers, Eric M. (1996). "The British and American Rediscovery of the Holy Land in the Early-Nineteenth Century and David Roberts". In Davies, W.D.; Meyers, E.M.; Schroth, S.W. (eds.). Jerusalem and the Holy Land Rediscovered: The Prints of David Roberts (1796 1864). San Francisco, CA: Harper and Row. ISBN 978-0-938989-15-8.
- Proctor, J. Harris (1998). "David Roberts and the ideology of imperialism". The Muslim World. 38 (1): 47–66. doi:10.1111/j.1478-1913.1998.tb03645.x.
- Schroth, Sarah W. (1996). "David Roberts in context". In Davies, W.D.; Meyers, E.M.; Schroth, S.W. (eds.). Jerusalem and the Holy Land Rediscovered: The Prints of David Roberts (1796–1864). Durham, NC: Duke University Museum of Art. pp. 39–49.
- Wharton, Annabel Jane (2006). Selling Jerusalem: Relics, Replicas, Theme Parks. University of Chicago Press. ISBN 978-0-226-89422-5.
- Wheatley-Irving, Linda (2007). "Holy Land photographs and their worlds: Francis Bedford and the 'Tour in the East'". The Jerusalem Quarterly. 31: 79–96. doi:10.70190/jq.I31.p79.
