= King's Garden =

King's Garden may refer to:

- King's Garden (biblical place)
- Al-Bustan (East Jerusalem)
- King's Garden (Odense), Denmark
- King's Garden, Fort Ticonderoga, New York, US
- Ġnien is-Sultan (Maltese: King's Garden), Valletta, Malta
- Königsgarten, in Paradeplatz, Königsberg, Germany
- Kungsträdgården (King's Garden), Stockholm, Sweden
- Rosenborg Castle Gardens (Danish: Kongens Have, literally The King's Garden), Copenhagen, Denmark

== See also ==
- Danish King's Garden, a park in Tallinn Old Town, Estonia
- King's Schools, Seattle, Washington, US; originally named King's Garden
- King's Stairs Gardens, a park in Bermondsey, London
- Potager du roi, Versailles (Kitchen Garden of the King), near the Palace of Versailles, France
- Royal Gardens (disambiguation)
