= Spiritual death in Christianity =

Separation from God caused by sin

In Christian theology, spiritual death is separation from God caused by sin.

== Protestantism ==
The phrase spiritual death is not found in Protestant scriptures, and definitions of the concept thus vary among Protestant Christians. Spiritual death is distinct from physical death and the second death. According to the doctrine of original sin, all people have a sinful nature and thus commit sin, and are thereby spiritually dead. Those who have faith in Jesus Christ are thereafter made spiritually alive. The unbeliever's physical death, subsequent resurrection, and final judgment is followed by the second death.

== Mormonism ==
Members of the Church of Jesus Christ of Latter-day Saints make a distinction between two types of spiritual death, respectively termed a "temporal separation" and a "spiritual separation" from God.

The first type is a physical separation from God the Father, which was caused by the Fall of Adam and Eve. Because of their choice, all their descendants are born into a fallen world that is physically separated from God's presence. This separation is necessary so that individuals can be tested to see whether they will continue to be obedient even when not in God's presence. This separation is overcome unconditionally when all people return to God's physical presence for the Judgment, according to Gerald N. Lund.

The second type is a spiritual separation from God's spirit or influence, which is caused by individual sins; when we sin we alienate ourselves from the influence of the Holy Ghost, God's spiritual presence. This separation is absolutely unnecessary, and only impedes our growth and ability to develop Godly attributes. This separation begins its resolution through the covenant of baptism, after which a person receives the gift of the Holy Ghost. It is only overcome on the conditions of faith and repentance.

This distinction between two kinds of spiritual death gives Mormonism a unique approach to the problem of evil, compared to the rest of Christianity. That is, it obviates the need to explain the suffering of innocents with reference to Adam and Eve's sin. Instead, it allows for mortal pain and suffering to be necessary without implying that sinning is necessary.

== See also ==
- Christian eschatology
- Spiritual death
