= Samkhiel =

Angel in Gehenna

Samkhiel (Hebrew: סמכיאל, "God is my support") is the angel of destruction who oversees the punishments of the beinonim, the “morally divided” souls who are sent to Gehenna. Through fiery torments he cleanses the souls of their wickedness and afterwards, assists in their eventual return to God (III Enoch; BhM 5:186).

== See also ==
- Angel
- Angels in Judaism
- Gehenna
