= Gehenna (disambiguation) =

Gehenna is a valley in Jerusalem, and an analogue of Hell or Lake of Fire in Jewish and Christian tradition.

Gehenna may also refer to:

== Fiction ==
- Gehenna (comics), a character in the DC Comics universe
- Gehenna (Dungeons & Dragons), an Outer Plane of evil alignment in the fantasy role-playing game Dungeons & Dragons
- Gehenna, the vampires' prophesied Armageddon in the role-playing game Vampire: The Masquerade
  - Gehenna (Vampire: The Masquerade), the 2004 supplement where the end of the world is outlined
- Gehenna, a fictional planet, the setting for C. J. Cherryh's 1983 novel Forty Thousand in Gehenna
- "Gehenna", a 1971 short story by Barry N. Malzberg

=== Film and television ===
- Gehenna (1938 film), a 1938 Polish melodrama
- "Gehenna" (Millennium), a 1996 episode of the TV series Millennium
- Gehenna: Where Death Lives (2018 film), an American-Japanese horror film

== Music ==
- Gehenna (band), a Norwegian black/death metal band
- Gehenna, a 2001 EP by metal band Before the Dawn, and its title track
- "Gehenna", a song by metal band Slipknot on the 2008 album All Hope Is Gone
- "Gehenna", a music cue from the film 1917 that appears on its official soundtrack

== See also ==
- Hades
- Hell
- Hell in popular culture
- Jahannam, an Islamic concept of Hell
