= Ein Rogel =

Coordinates: 31°46′04″N 35°14′08″E

Ein Rogel (Hebrew: עין רגל ʿĒn Rōgēl) is a spring on the outskirts of Jerusalem, mentioned in the Hebrew Bible. It is most commonly identified as what Arabs refer to as Well of Job (Arabic: بئر أيوب Bir Ayoub) in Silwan, though some scholars dispute this view.

== Hebrew Bible ==
The name "Ein Rogel" appears in the Hebrew Bible. It is also variously transcribed as Enrogel (2 Samuel 17:17, King James Version), En-rogel (2 Samuel 17:17, American Standard Version and English Standard Version), or En Rogel (2 Samuel 17:17, NIV and NKJV).

Ein Rogel may have been a sacred place in pre-Israelite times.

En Rogel was one of the boundary marks between Judah and Benjamin (Joshua 15:7, 18:16).

Ein Rogel was mentioned in the Hebrew Bible as the hiding-place of David's spies, Jonathan and Ahimaaz, during Absalom's uprising against the rule of King David (2 Samuel 17:17). Jonathan and Ahimaaz stayed there "for they dared not be seen coming into the city (Jerusalem); so a female servant would come and tell them, and they would go and tell King David". However, "a lad saw them, and told Absalom", and so they had to flee to Bahurim (2 Samuel 17:17–18).

Ein Rogel lay close to a stone, Zoheleth, where Adonijah, Solomon's half-brother of, held a sacrificial feast when he attempted to assert his claims to the throne (1 Kings 1:9).

The obviously sacred character of the spring suggests that it is the same as the Dragon Well or Serpent Well of Nehemiah 2:13.

== Ein Rogel: etymology ==
As of 1901, the meaning of the name Ein Rogel was uncertain. The interpretation 'Fuller's Well' does not bear the mark of antiquity. It is probable that, like Zoheleth, the original name had some sacred or mythic significance. The etymology according to Strong's Concordance is that the word originally meant "eye of a traveller"; a spring was seen as an "eye" in the landscape, "ein/ʿayn" meaning both spring and eye.

== Cairo Geniza description of "Ein Rogel" ==
Ein Rogel is mentioned in "Topography of Jerusalem", a document found in the Cairo Geniza, which describes how the water breaks through to the riverbed after a winter of plentiful rainfall.

== Identification ==
=== Bir Ayoub well in Silwan ===
The application of the Biblical name Ein Rogel to the well of Bir Ayoub in Silwan is long-standing amongst early European travellers to Jerusalem.

=== Arguments against Bir Ayoub ===
As of 1901, the identification of the Bir Ayoub well with Biblical Ein Rogel was uncertain, Charles Warren being one of its skeptics. Bir-Ayoub is a well, not a spring (although it may have formerly been a spring), and is said to lie too far from ez-Zehweleh, although it lies near a large stone in Siloam village called Zehwillat. As Bir Ayoub is in full view of the city, it does not suit the context of 2 Sam. 17:17, and its antiquity is uncertain.

=== Gihon Spring/Virgin's Fountain alternative ===
Charles Warren thought that Ein Rogel was to be identified with the Virgin's fountain, or what is also known as Gihon Spring.

The Virgin's fountain (ʻAin Sitti Maryam), later ʻAin Umm ed-Deraj, has also been suggested for Ein Rogel as 'the only real spring close to Jerusalem', exactly opposite to which lies ez-Zehweleh, perhaps Zoheleth. The chief points in favour of this are its antiquity and the evidence of Josephus, who places the well in the royal gardens. Other arguments are based upon the fact that in later times the well was used by fullers.

== Bir Ayoub ==
Bir Ayoub
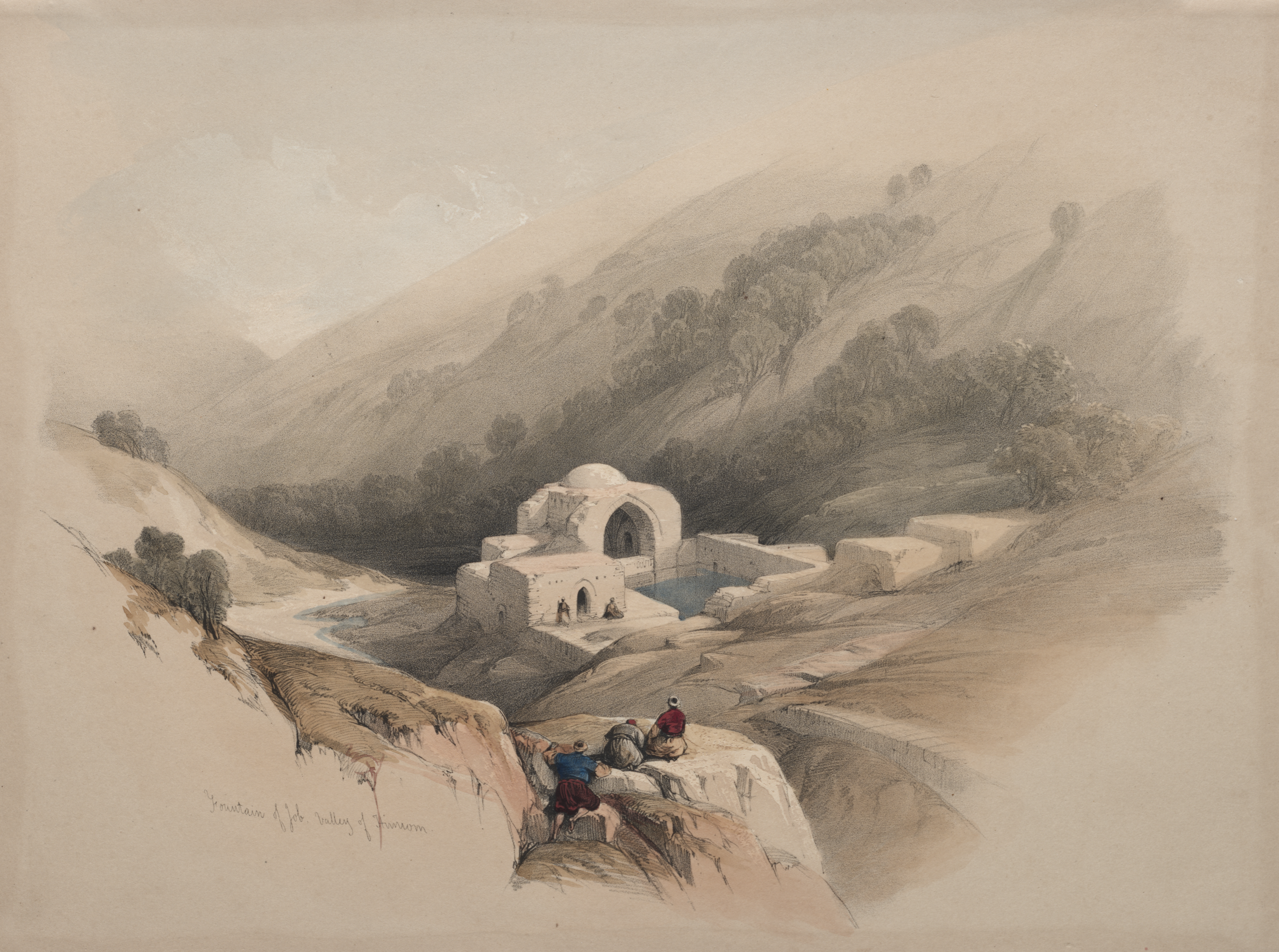
- Bir Ayoub, 1840 illustration from The Holy Land, Syria, Idumea, Arabia, Egypt, and Nubia
- Interactive map of Bir Ayoub
- Location: Silwan, Kidron Valley, Jerusalem

=== Names ===
==== Bir Ayyub ====
Some scholars identify Ein Rogel with Bir Ayyub. The application of the name Bir Ayyub (Arabic: بئر أيوب Bir Ayoub, also spelled Ayyub, Ayoub) to the site is old, which translates to "Fountain of Job" or "Job's Well", as it was used by the local inhabitants of Jerusalem in early modern times. Clermont-Ganneau was surprised when local fellahin pronounced it as "be'er" (as in Hebrew) rather than "bir" (as in Arabic). The name was used in Mujir al-Din's 1495 work "The glorious history of Jerusalem and Hebron" as if it was already long-standing.

The name, "Job's Well", is said to have been given to the site on account of an Arab legend which claimed that when the prophet Job was sick and eaten of worms, he went and bathed in a hole full of water, which stood where the well now stands, and that, at length, Job recovered his health and his body turned youthful, while the pool turned into a plenteous spring.

==== Be'er Yoav ====
Israeli geographer Zev Vilnay brings down an etymological account of the Arabic name Bir Ayyub, reporting in the name of the Jewish traveler Moshe Yerushalmi, who visited Palestine in circa 1765. According to him, there was a well-established tradition amongst Jews in the city that the original name of the well was Be'er Yoav (Eng. 'well of Joab'). Moshe Yerushalmi wrote in his book, "The Ishmaelites say that it is Bir Ayyub ('the well of Job'), but they do not know, nor do they understand, that it is the 'well of Joab' (Heb. Yoav), for thus is the received tradition by the people of Israel, generation after generation, but the gentiles have reversed the letters."

==== Well of Nehemiah or Well of Fire ====
Bir Ayoub is also known as the Well of Nehemiah, or Puteus ignis ('well of fire'), in reference to the location in which the sacred fire was hidden during the Jewish captivity in 2 Maccabees 1:19–22. This name only started to be used in the 16th century.

=== Description and accounts ===
Robinson, during his tour of Palestine in 1838, describes Bir Ayoub (Job's Well) as being "a very deep well, of an irregular quadrilateral form, walled up with large squared stones, terminating above in an arch on one said, and apparently of great antiquity. There is a small rude building over it, furnished with one or two large troughs." The well, he said, went down to a depth of 125 feet (38 m).

Gustaf Dalman, who visited Palestine in the early 20th century, mentions a custom of the local inhabitants of Silwan to visit Bir Ayoub (Well of Job) and to recite a blessing for the coming rain. During periods of great rain downpour, as happened in February 1927, a gushing spring would issue out of the earth some 47 metres (154 ft) downstream from the Well of Job.

A water plant was established near Bir Ayoub, which involved large expenses and a lot of labor. A canal was hewn in the rock, 2 meters high and 0.5 to 1 meter wide. The conduit is more than 600 meters long and passes under the western side of the stream channel at a depth of 23 to 30 meters below the surface. The place can be reached by a staircase that is interrupted in some places. It appears that the purpose of this conduit was to store the water flowing between the layers of limestone. It is located just south of the junction of the three valleys - Wadi er-Rababi (Hinnom), Central and Kidron. Today there is a modern pumping station there, drawing water from a 38 m deep well, whose stone lining may be partially of Roman date.

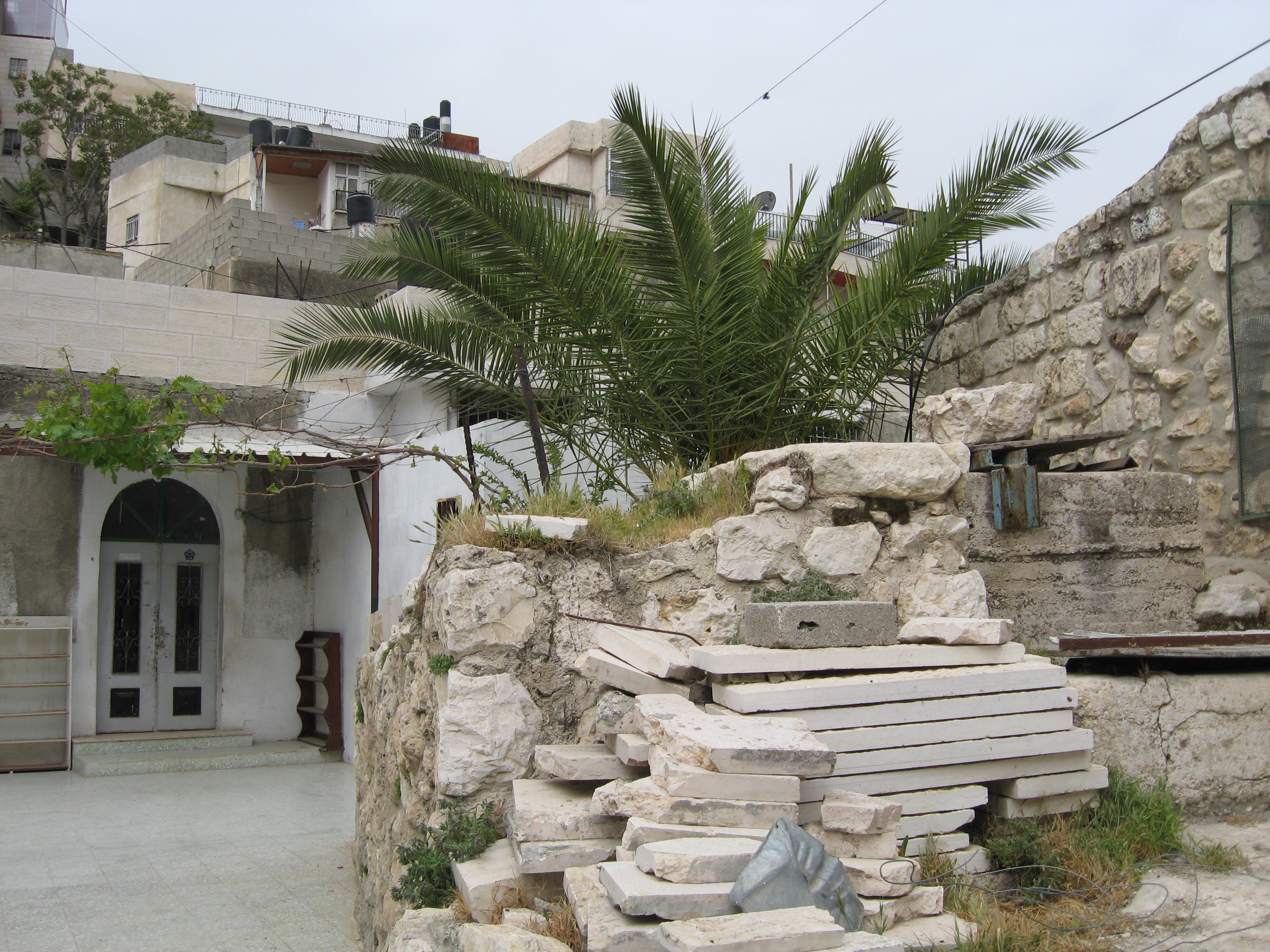
The modern Bir Ayoub mosque in Silwan, built on top of Job's Well

Today the Bir Ayoub Mosque of Silwan stands above the Bir Ayoub well.

=== Gallery ===
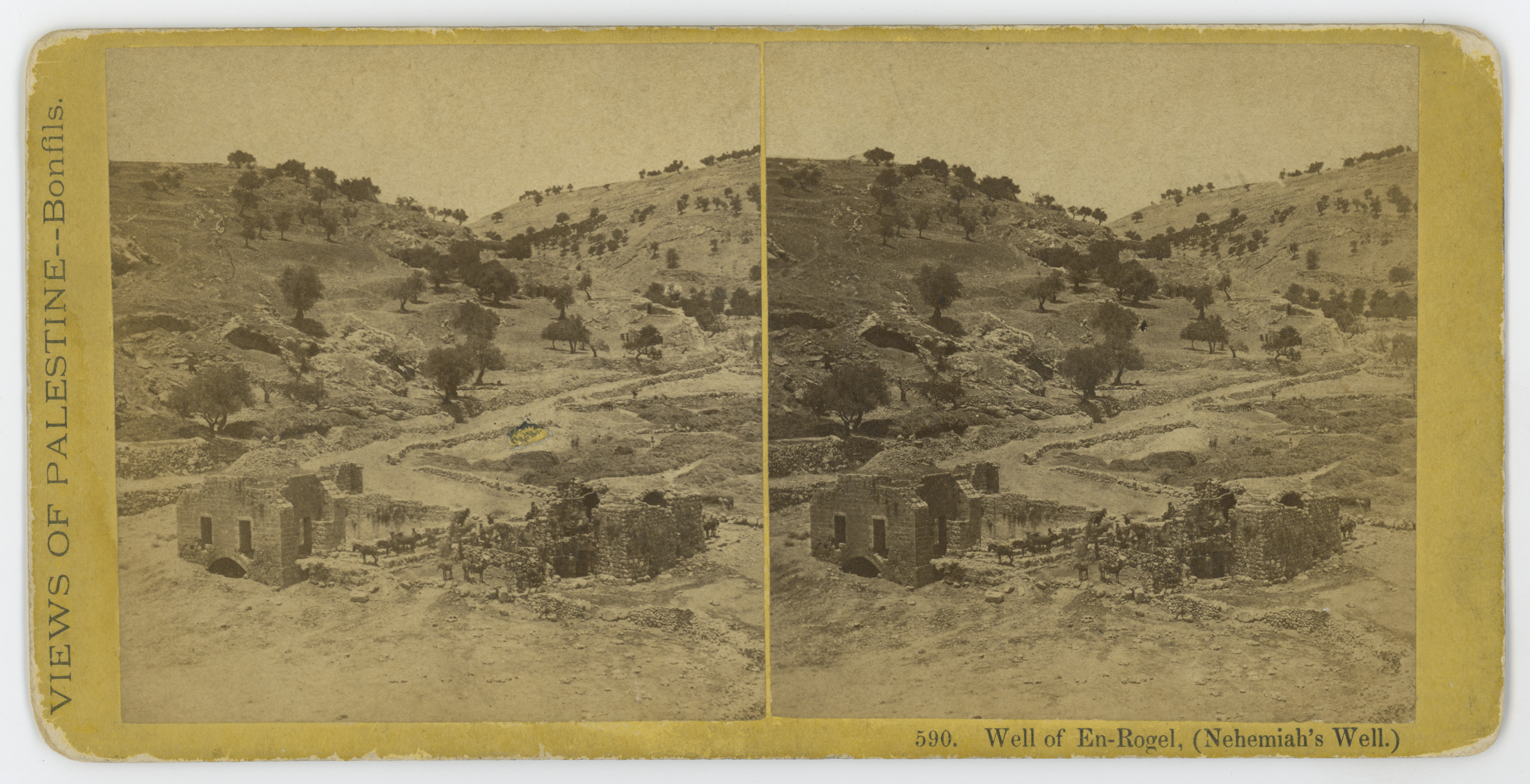
Nehemiah's Well on double, or stereoscopic photo card, Bonfils, ca. 1870.

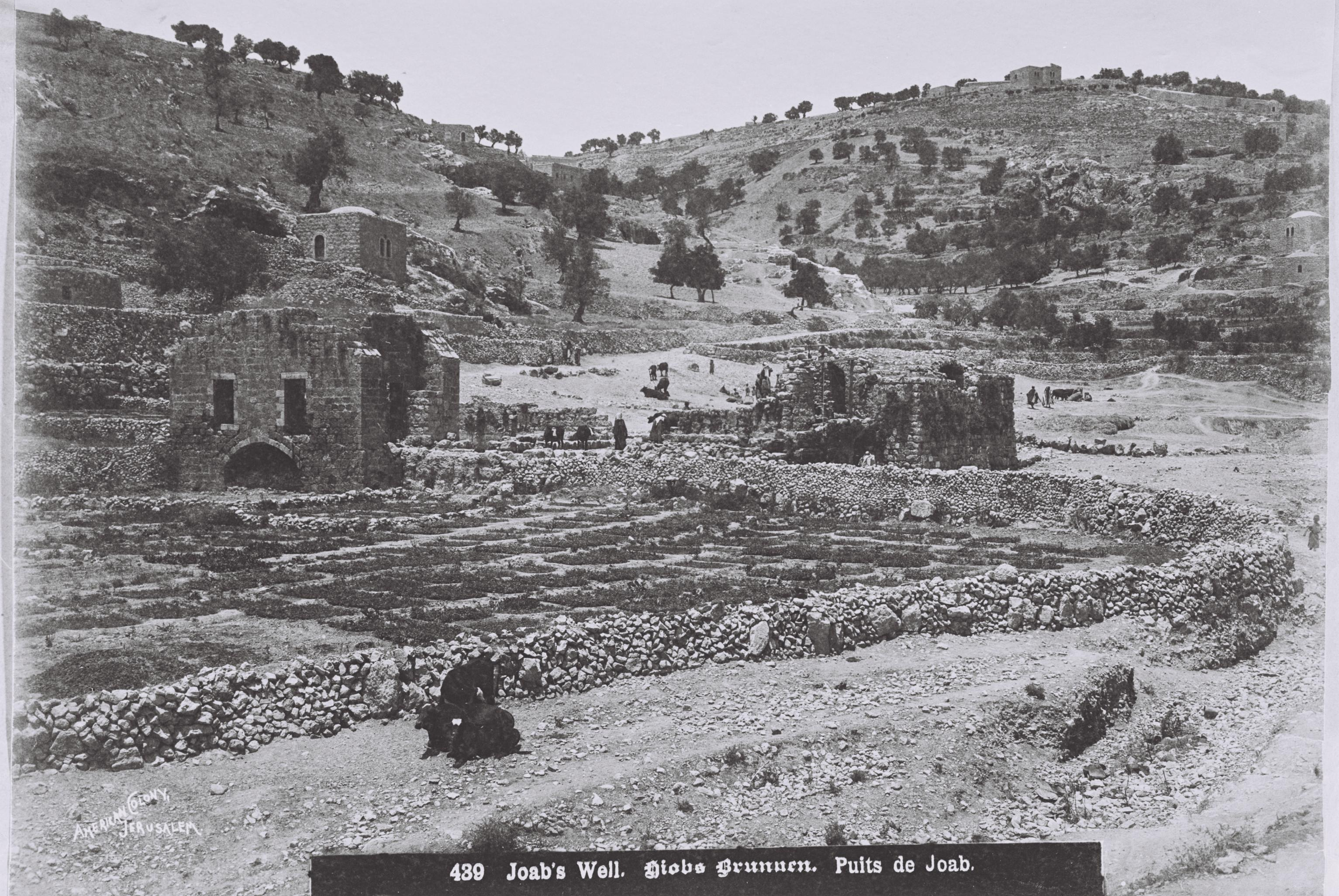
Bir Ayub in 1910

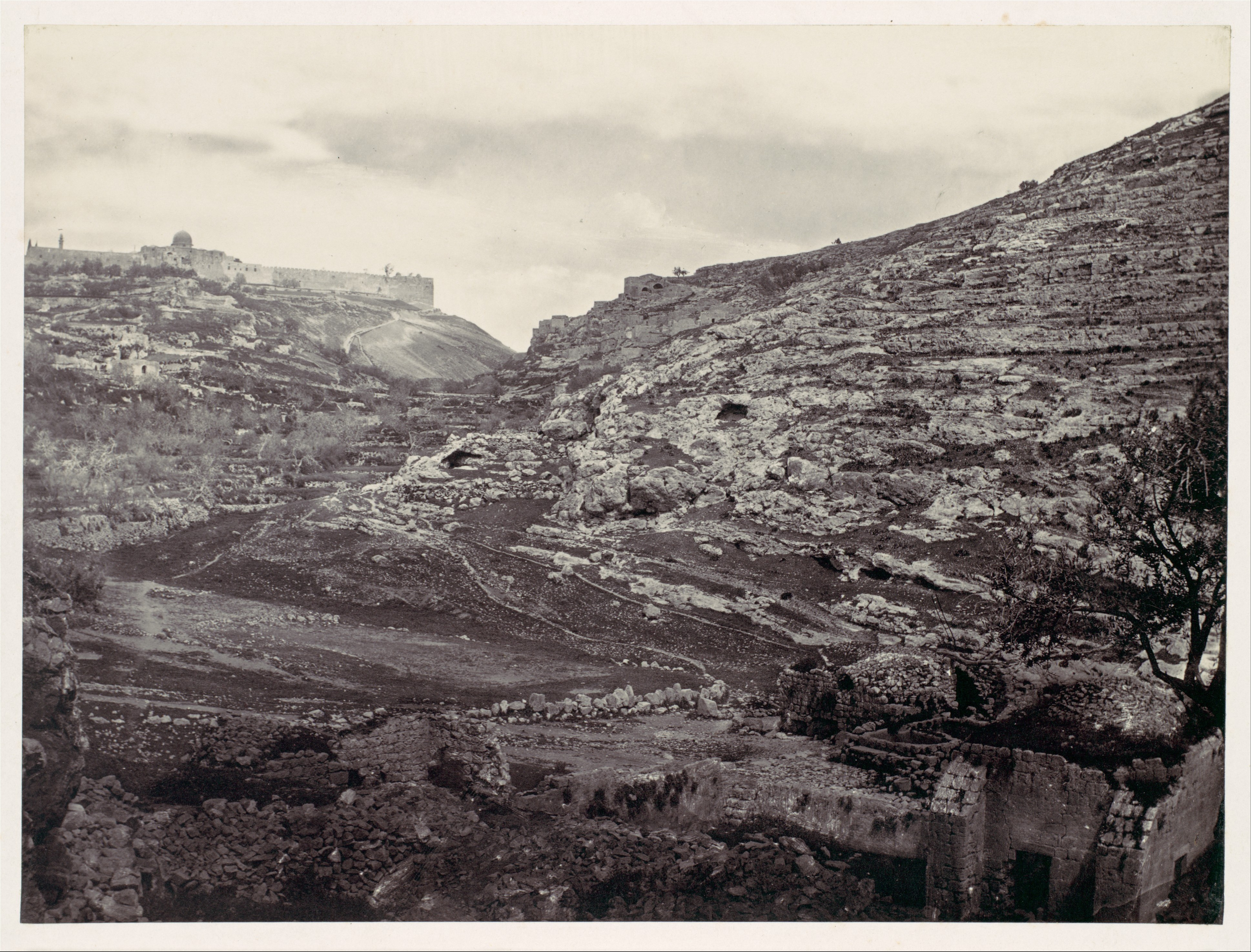
Photo of Bir Ayoub ("Ein Rogel") and the Temple Mount ("Moriah") by Francis Frith, c. 1857
