= Lake of fire =

Concept of after-death punishment of the wicked in Christianity

The lake of fire is a concept that appears in both the ancient Egyptian and Christian religions. In ancient Egypt, it appears as an obstacle on the journey through the underworld which can destroy or refresh the deceased. In Christianity, it is a concept of after-death punishment of the wicked. The phrase is used in five verses of the Book of Revelation. In the biblical context, the concept is similar to the Jewish Gehenna. The image of the lake of fire was taken up by the early Christian Hippolytus of Rome in about the year 230 and has continued to be used by modern Christians.

== Ancient Egyptian religion ==
The lake of fire in the Duat guarded by baboons

Fiery rivers and lakes in the underworld are mentioned in works such as the Coffin Texts and the Egyptian Book of the Dead. Around their edges sit flaming braziers or baboons. Ra would pass through this lake on his journey through the Duat, renewing his boat. Chapter 126 of the Egyptian Book of the Dead is associated with this vignette and the text is addressed to the "four baboons who sit in the prow of the Barque of Re." The lake was one of the dangers encountered on the journey through the Duat and had a dual nature. The baboons who guarded the pool were a force that could refresh and protect the deceased if they knew the correct recitation or destroy them if they did not. In the 21st Dynasty, human figures are depicted within the lakes. These represent enemies of the king or gods and their inclusion within the pools ensures their permanent destruction. In this way, the deceased could avoid meeting a similar fate, and be victorious over the forces of chaos like Ra. Am-heh, whose name means "devourer of millions" or "eater of eternity", is a hunting dog headed god from the underworld who lived in a lake of fire.

== Christianity ==
=== Book of Revelation ===
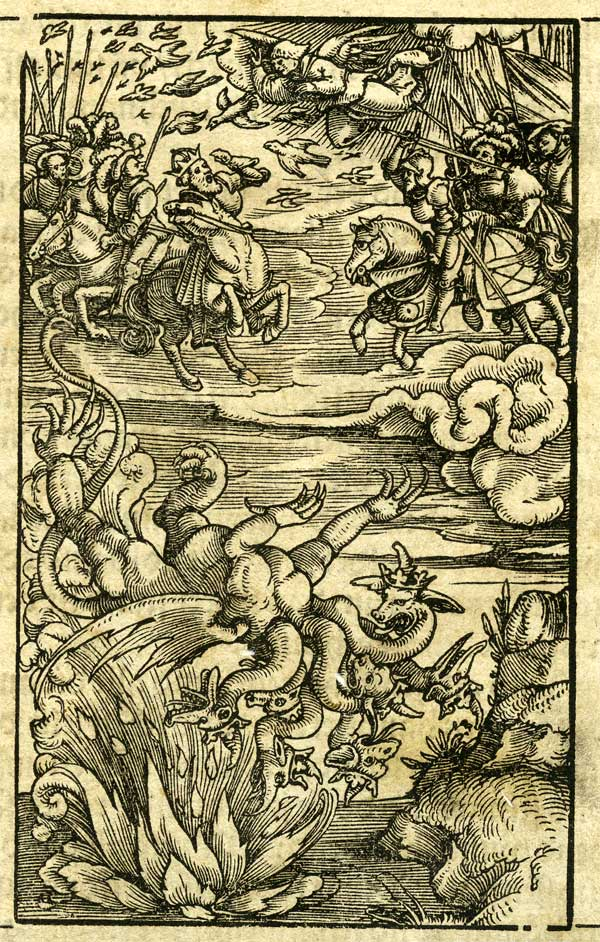
The Beast and False Prophet are thrown into the lake of fire (Zürich Bible, 1531)

The Book of Revelation has five verses that mention a "lake of fire" (Ancient Greek: λίμνη τοῦ πυρός, romanized: limne tou pyros):

And the beast was taken, and with him the false prophet that wrought miracles before him, with which he deceived them that had received the mark of the beast, and them that worshipped his image. These both were cast alive into a lake of fire burning with brimstone.

— Revelation 19:20, KJV

And the devil that deceived them was cast into the lake of fire and brimstone, where the beast and the false prophet are, and shall be tormented day and night for ever and ever.

— Revelation 20:10, KJV

Then Death and Hades (Note: The King James Version of Revelation 20:14–15 and the 21st century King James Version have "hell" where some more-modern versions have "Hades" (a transliteration of the Greek word in the text).) were cast into the lake of fire. This is the second death. And anyone not found written in the Book of Life was cast into the lake of fire.

— Revelation 20:14–15, NKJV

But as for the cowardly, the faithless, the detestable, as for murderers, the sexually immoral, sorcerers, idolaters, and all liars, their portion will be in the lake that burns with fire and sulfur, which is the second death.

— Revelation 21:8, ESV

A traditional interpretation is that the "lake of fire" is symbolic of the pain of being separated from God, as punishment for wickedness. The Greek words translated "torment" or "tormented" in English come from the root βάσανος, basanos with the original meaning of "the testing of gold and silver as a medium of exchange by the proving stone" and a later connotation of a person, especially a slave, "severely tested by torture" to reveal truth. It can also have a connotation of restraint.

=== Denominational views ===
==== Anabaptism ====
Anabaptist Christians distinguish between the intermediate state that one enters after death, and the final state after the Last Judgment:

ARTICLE XVIL OF THE INTERMEDIATE STATE: We believe that in the interval between death and resurrection, the righteous will be with Christ in a state of conscious bliss and comfort, but that the wicked will be in a place of torment, in a state of conscious suffering and despair. Lu. 16:19–31; 23:43; Phil. 1:23; II Cor. 5:1–8; I Thes. 5:10; II Pet. 2:9 (R.V.).

ARTICLE XVII. OF THE FINAL STATE: We believe that hell is the place of torment, prepared for the devil and his angels, where with them the wicked will suffer the vengeance of eternal fire forever and ever and that heaven is the final abode of the righteous, where they will dwell in the fullness of joy forever and ever. Matt. 25:41, 46; Jude 7; Rev. 14:8–11; 20:10, 15; II Cor. 5:21; Rev. 21:3–8; 22:1–5. —1921 Garden City Confession of Faith (Mennonite Anabaptist)

==== Restorationism ====
Jehovah's Witnesses interpret the "lake of fire" and "second death" of the Book of Revelation as referring to a symbol, not a literal lake, of a complete and definitive annihilation of those cast into it.

Seventh-day Adventists believe in annihilation as well. They too believe that the lake of fire passage is referring to extinction, not to eternal torment.

Members of the Church of Jesus Christ of Latter-day Saints and other churches within the Latter Day Saint Movement read of a concept of the "lake of fire" in the Book of Mormon in several passages. The most descriptive instance of a "lake of fire" in the Book of Mormon occurs in Jacob 6:10, which reads, "Ye must go away into that lake of fire and brimstone, whose flames are unquenchable, and whose smoke ascendeth up forever and ever, which lake of fire and brimstone is endless torment." The Book of Mormon also refers to the lake of fire as a state of spiritual death, which can be overcome through the Atonement of Jesus Christ or, for sons of perdition, never.

=== Third century ===
Hippolytus of Rome (d. 235) pictured Hades, the abode of the dead, as containing "a lake of unquenchable fire" at the edge of which the unrighteous "shudder in horror at the expectation of the future judgment, (as if they were) already feeling the power of their punishment". The lake of fire is described by Hippolytus unambiguously as the place of eternal torment for the sinners after the resurrection.

=== 20th-century views ===
The Catholic Portuguese visionary Lúcia Santos reported that the Virgin Mary (Our Lady of Fatima) had given her a vision of a sea of fire:

Our Lady showed us a great sea of fire which seemed to be under the earth. Plunged in this fire were demons and souls in human form, like transparent burning embers, all blackened or burnished bronze, floating about in the conflagration, now raised into the air by the flames that issued from within themselves together with great clouds of smoke, now falling back on every side like sparks in a huge fire, without weight or equilibrium, and amid shrieks and groans of pain and despair, which horrified us and made us tremble with fear.

=== Universalist eschatology ===
Early Christian Universalists, most notably Origen of Alexandria (c. 184 – c. 253), and Gregory of Nyssa (c. 335 – c. 395), understood the lake of fire as a symbolic purifying fire used to eliminate the dross from the gold, or a "refiner's crucible". Origen refers to the "lead of wickedness" that must be refined out of the gold. Origen obtained his Universalist views, known then as apocatastasis, from his mentor Clement of Alexandria (c. 150 – c. 215), who was a student of Pantaenus. Origen explained the refining metaphor in response to a philosopher named Celsus who accused Christians of representing God as a merciless tormentor armed with fire.

In the view of Origen:

Our God is a 'consuming fire' in the sense in which we have taken the word; and thus he enters in as a 'refiner's fire' to refine the rational nature, which has been filled with the lead of wickedness, and to free it from the other impure materials which adulterate the natural gold or silver, so to speak, of the soul.

19th-century scholar Charles Bigg summarized Origen's view as, "Slowly yet certainly the blessed change must come, the purifying fire must eat up the dross and leave the pure gold. One by one we shall enter into rest, never to stray again. Then when death, the last enemy, is destroyed, when the tale of his children is complete, Christ will 'drink wine in the kingdom of his Father.' This is the end, when 'all shall be one, as Christ and the Father are one,' when 'God shall be all in all.'"

In the view of Gregory of Nyssa, "when death approaches to life, and darkness to light, and the corruptible to the incorruptible, the inferior is done away with and reduced to non-existence, and the thing purged is benefited, just as the dross is purged from gold by fire."

Further evidence corroborating their interpretation of the lake of fire as a "refiner's crucible" is that the Greek word commonly translated as "lake" also refers to something small, like a pond or a "pool", as translated in the Wycliffe and New American Bible (NABRE).

== See also ==
- Ammit
- Hell
- Eternal life (Christianity)
- Inferno (disambiguation)
- Lake of Fire (song)
- Lake of Fire (film)
- Purgatory
- Pyriphlegethon
