= Oiketerion =

Greek word meaning "dwelling"

Oiketerion (οἰκητήριον) is a Greek word meaning "dwelling", or "habitation".

It is used in two places in the Bible; in the King James Version translation, they are:

(Jude 1:6) – And the angels which kept not their first estate, but left their own habitation, he hath reserved in everlasting chains under darkness unto the judgment of the great day.

(2 Corinthians 5:2) – For in this we groan, earnestly desiring to be clothed upon with our house which is from heaven.

For the latter verse, the term has been interpreted as meaning "the body as a dwelling place for the spirit".

== See also ==
- Christian eschatology
- Resurrection of the dead in Christianity
