= Second death =

Eschatological concept in Judaism and Christianity

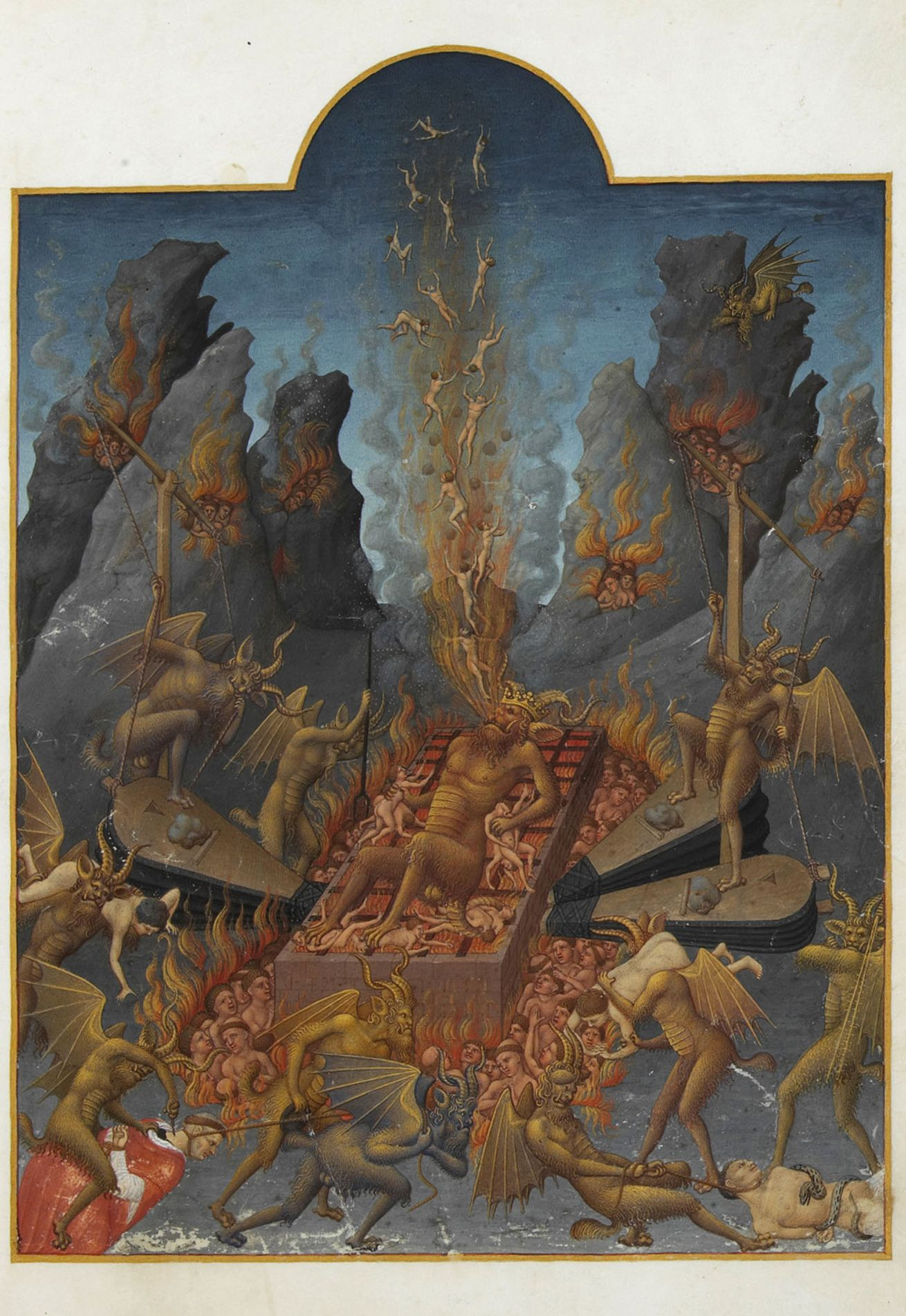
Folio from the Très Riches Heures du duc de Berry: Hell. 15th century.

The second death, also known as eternal death, is an eschatological concept in various religious and esoteric traditions, prominently featured in Judaism, Christianity, and Mandaeism, where it generally refers to punishment after a first/initial death on Earth.

However the concept also appears in classical antiquity, Egyptian mythology, and modern Western esotericism: in these non-Christian contexts, the "second death" typically signifies the natural post mortem dissolution of the human soul, which does not survive eternally.

== Judaism ==
Although the term is not found in the Hebrew Bible (the Canonical collection of Hebrew scriptures), Harry Sysling identifies a consistent usage of the term "second death" in texts of the Second Temple period and early rabbinical writings. In most cases, the "second death" is identical with the judgment, following the resurrection, in Gehinnom at the Last Day.

=== Targum Deuteronomy ===
In Targum Neofiti (Neof.) and the fragments (FTP and FTV), on the verse Deutoronomy 33:6, the "second death" is "the death that the wicked die."

=== Targum Isaiah ===
Targum Isaiah has three occurrences. The first is 22:14, where the Aramaic paraphrases the Hebrew as "This sin will not be forgiven you until you die the second death." The final two examples are from Targum Isaiah 65, which sets the scene for an apocalyptic final battle. Targum Isaiah 65:6 paraphrases the Hebrew in line with the interpretation of the penultimate verse of the Hebrew Isaiah found in the Gospel of Mark, where "their worm does not die" is equated with Gehinnom. Here both Targum Isaiah and Gospel of Mark supply the term "Gehinnom", where Hebrew Isaiah simply concludes with the heaps of corpses following the last battle where "their worm does not die", making no further eschatological extension into resurrection and judgment.

=== Targum Jeremiah ===
Targum Jeremiah 51:17 has the Aramaic "they shall die the second death and not live in the world to come", which appears to depart from the other Targum uses in not being explicit that the second death is after resurrection but may instead be an exclusion from resurrection.

=== Targum Psalms ===
The majority reading of Targum Psalm 49:11 has the Aramaic translation "For the wise see that the evil-doers are judged in Gehinnom". However, several manuscripts, including Paris No.10, Montefiore No.7, and Targum of Salomos 113 have the variant Aramaic translation "He sees men wise in wickedness, who die a second death, and are judged in Gehinnom".

=== Rabbinic interpretations ===
David Kimhi (Toulouse, c. 1160–Narbonne, 1235) considered the phrase to mean "the death of the soul in the world".

Maimonides declares, in his 13 principles of faith, that the souls of the wicked would be punished with annihilation.

Bahya ben Asher understands second death as referring to the death of a soul after it has been reincarnated, i.e., after Gilgul Neshamot.

== Christianity ==
The term "second death" occurs four times in the New Testament, specifically in Revelation 2:11, 20:6, 20:14, and 21:8. According to Revelation 2:11 and 20:6, those who overcome the devil's tribulation have part in the first resurrection and will not be hurt by the second death, which has no power over them. Revelation 20:14 and 21:8 connect the lake of fire to the second death.

=== Interpretation ===
One interpretation states that when people are saved, they are not subject to the second death and only die of the earthly first death, whereas an unsaved person will experience two deaths: the first at the end of this life and the second after the resurrection. The second death has been interpreted as endless torment by many, Lactantius being one of them:

We term that punishment the second death, which is itself also perpetual, as is immortality. [...] we thus define the second death: Death is the suffering of eternal pain, or thus: Death is the condemnation of souls for their deserts to eternal punishments.

Annihilationists and conditionalists, including all Seventh-day Adventists and Jehovah's Witnesses, and many others in many denominations, oppose the idea of eternal suffering and believe that the second death is a literal death and that the bodies and souls condemned to it after the final judgment will be completely destroyed. Many believe there is limited conscious torment after the first death, but many others believe there is none and thus those who experience the second death cease to exist instantly.

Christian universalists, who believe all will be reconciled to God, offer different interpretations, rejecting both endless torment and utter destruction. Gregory of Nyssa understood the second death as a cleansing, albeit a painful process. He wrote that "those still living in the flesh must as much as ever they can separate and free themselves in a way from its attachments by virtuous conduct, in order that after death they may not need a second death to cleanse them".

== Mandaeism ==
Mandaeans believe that the souls which could not be purified inside of demon Ur would get destroyed along with him at the end of days, so they die the second death. Other evil powers and the planets will suffer this "second death" in the blazing "sea of the end" as well.

== Modern esotericism ==
Within 20th-century esoteric Traditionalism, the Italian philosopher Julius Evola integrated the concept of the second death into his broader critique of Western religion, drawing heavily from comparative mythology and ancient initiatory rites. He rejected the mainstream Christian view of the afterlife, characterizing it as a democratic and consolatory construct that erroneously assumed the automatic immortality of every human soul, confusing true immortality with a precarious post mortem survival.

Evola posited instead that the human soul does not automatically survive death, referencing the Egyptian rite of psychostasia, in which the psychic core of many souls was devoured by Ammit, the Tibetan Bardo, where the deceased risked losing their identity under the threat of monstrous beings, and the Eleusinian Mysteries of ancient Greece, which aimed to prevent drinking from the river Lethe to avoid the loss of memory.

In his view, for the ordinary person who typically identifies with the passionate and lower components of his being, the second death represents an absolute ending, and a tragedy of self-extinction. Conversely, for the initiates who achieved spiritual awakening during life, the second death is a serene and liberating transition, as they have successfully stabilized their incorruptible spiritual core.

== In popular culture ==
The concept of the second death is the central theme of the 2017 animated film Coco, in which the souls of the deceased fade away into definitive oblivion once they are no longer remembered by anyone in the world of the living.

The film draws inspiration from the Mexican holiday Día de los Muertos (Day of the Dead), which is dedicated to commemorating the deceased based on the belief that being remembered by living relatives prolongs their existence.

== See also ==
- Bardo
- Intermediate state (Christianity)
- Lethe
- Spiritual death
- Weighing of souls
