= Zoheleth =

Rocky plateau near the centre of the village of Siloam

Zoheleth - (זֹחֶלֶת in Hebrew) - the serpent-stone, is a rocky plateau near the centre of the village of Siloam, and near the fountain of Ein-rogel, to which the women of the village resort for water (1 Kings 1:5-9). There Adonijah (q.v.) feasted all the royal princes except Solomon and the men who took part with him in his effort to succeed to the throne. While they were assembled here Solomon was proclaimed king, through the intervention of Nathan. On hearing this, Adonijah fled and took refuge in the sanctuary (1 Kings 1:49-53). He was afterwards pardoned.

Zoheleth projects into or slightly over-hangs the Kidron Valley. Conder and Kitchener proposed linking it to the cliff on which the village of Silwan is located, known to local peasants as Zahweileh.

Zoheleth is also the title of a novel by J Francis Hudson (Lion Publishing 1994). It concerns the revolt of Absalom against King David, as seen through the eyes of one of Absalom's servants.
