= Book of Life =

Book used by God in Abrahamic religions

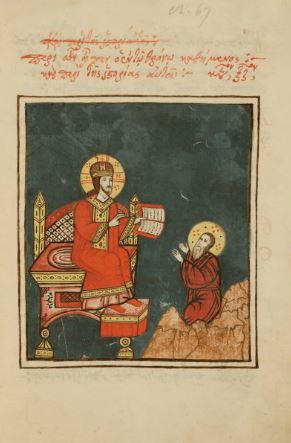
Christian depiction of the Book of Life

In Judaism and Christianity, the Book of Life (Biblical Hebrew: ספר החיים, romanized: Sefer HaḤayyim; Ancient Greek: βιβλίον τῆς ζωῆς, romanized: Biblíon tēs Zōēs; Arabic: سفر الحياة, romanized: Sifr al-Ḥayā) is a book in which God records—or will record in the future—the names of every person who is destined for Heaven and the world to come.

The Talmud, in tractate Rosh Hashanah 16b:12, relates the teaching of Rabbis Kruspedai and Johanan bar Nappaha—both amoraim, with the latter being the teacher of the former—that the Books of Life and Death are opened every Rosh Hashanah, which, in contemporary Rabbinic Judaism, is known as the Jewish New Year. After he opens the books, God respectively inscribes and seals the fates of entirely righteous and entirely wicked individuals for the new year, but suspends judgment of all other (i.e., 'middling') individuals until Yom Kippur, when all destinies are sealed. The books are subsequently closed until the next Rosh Hashanah.

For these reasons, additional prayers are said for the inscription of one's soul in the Book of Life during recitations of the Amidah (עמידה, 'standing [prayer]') during the High Holy Days, the Ten Days of Repentance (עֲשֶׂרֶת יְמֵי תְּשׁוּבָה, ʿǍseret yəmēy təšūvā, and Hoshana Rabbah, which is the last day of Sukkot and the culmination of the Jewish High Holy Days.

== In the Hebrew Bible ==
In the Hebrew Bible, the Book of Life records those people considered righteous before God. To be blotted out of this book signifies death. To be in this book ensures one of life on the day of judgment. Even before birth, those who will be born are written in this book.

A related concept is used in Ezekiel 9:4, where an angel marks the righteous on their foreheads for life, while the remaining inhabitants of Jerusalem are doomed.

== In the Apocrypha ==
The apocryphal Book of Jubilees speaks of two heavenly tablets or books: a Book of Life for the righteous, and a Book of Death for those that walk in the paths of impurity and are written down on the heavenly tablets as adversaries (of God). Also, according to Jubilees 36:10, one who contrives evil against his neighbor will be blotted out of the Book of Remembrance of men, and will not be written in the Book of Life, but in the Book of Perdition. In Enoch 47:3 "the Ancient of Days" is described as seated upon his throne of glory with "the Book" or "the Books of Life" ("of the Living") opened before him. So are, according to Enoch 104:2, the righteous "written before the glory of the Great One," and, according to Enoch 108:3, the transgressors "blotted out of the Book of Life and out of the books of the holy ones." Reference is made also in The Shepherd of Hermas (Vision i. 3; Mandate viii.; Similitude ii.); in Revelation 3:5, 13:8, 17:8, 20:12–15, where "two Books" are spoken of as being "opened before the throne, the Book of Life, and the Book of Death, in which latter the unrighteous are recorded together with their evil deeds, in order to be cast into the lake of fire." It is the Book of Life in which the apostles' names are "written in heaven" (Luke 10:20), or "the fellow-workers" of Paul (Phil 4:3), and "the assembly of the first-born" (Hebrews 12:23; compare I Clem. 45:7b). Allusion is made also in Enoch 81:4, 89:61–77, 90:17–20, 98:6-15, 104:7; 2 Baruch 24:1; Ascension of Isaiah 9:20.

== In the New Testament ==
The text of the Book of Revelation (for Western Christianity one of the books of the New Testament, attributed to John of Patmos) refers to the Book of Life seven times (3:5, 13:8, 17:8, 20:12, 20:15, 21:27, 22:19(or, tree of life)). As described, only those whose names are written in the Book of Life from the foundation of the world, and have not been blotted out by the Lamb, are saved at the Last Judgment; all others are doomed. "And whosoever was not found written in the book of life was cast into the lake of fire" (Revelation 20:15—King James Version). "And I saw the dead, small and great, stand before God; and the books were opened: and another book was opened, which is the book of life: and the dead were judged out of those things which were written in the books, according to their works" (Revelation 20:12—King James Version).

The Book of Life is also mentioned in Paul's letter to the Philippians:

Clement also, and the rest of my fellow workers, whose names are in the Book of Life

== The eschatological or annual roll-call ==
While the prevailing tendency among apocryphal writers of the Hasidean school was to give the Book of Life an eschatological meaning, the Jewish liturgy and the tradition relating to the New Year and Atonement days adhered to the ancient view, which took the Book of Life in its natural meaning, preferring, from a practical point of view, the worldliness of Judaism to the heavenliness of the Essenes. Instead of transferring, as is done in the Book of Enoch, the Testament of Abraham, and elsewhere, the great Judgment Day to the hereafter, the Pharisaic school taught that on the first day of each year (Rosh Hashanah), God sits in judgment over his creatures and has the Books of Life together with the books containing the records of the righteous and the wicked.

The origin of the heavenly Book of Life must be sought in Babylonia, where legends speak of the Tablets of Destiny and of tablets containing the transgressions, sins, wrongdoings, curses and execrations of a person who should be "cast into the water"; that is, blotted out.

The living are the righteous, who alone are admitted to citizenship in the theocracy, while the wicked are denied membership and blotted out of God's book (Ex. xxxii. 32 et seq.). The life in which the righteous participate is to be understood in a temporal sense, as temporal life is apparently prayed for in the liturgical formula: "Inscribe us in the Book of Life."

In Daniel xii. 1, however, those who are found written in the book and who escape the troubles preparatory to the coming of the Messianic kingdom are they who, together with the risen martyrs, are destined to share in everlasting life. Eternal life is certainly meant in Enoch xlvii. 3, civ. 1, cviii. 3, and frequently in the New Testament, especially in Revelation. The Targum (Isa. iv. 3; Ezek. xiii. 9) speaks of the "Book of Eternal Life." The Mishnah states that the deeds of every human being are recorded in a book (Abot, ii. 1; see iii. 16). The Sefer Ḥasidim (xxxiii) pointedly adds that God is in no need of a book of records; "the Torah speaks the language of man."

== Fundraising ==
A book of life motif is frequently found in Jewish houses of worship. It is both a decorative feature and fundraiser. Some synagogues have raised money by inscribing congregation member's names in a "book of life" as a tribute to their financial generosity.

== See also ==
- Moirai
- Parcae
- Predestination
- Tree of life
- Water of Life (Christianity)
