= Royal Gardens =

Royal Gardens may refer to:

- Royal Gardens, Edmonton, a residential neighbourhood in Edmonton, Alberta, Canada
- Royal Botanic Gardens (disambiguation), several places
- Royal Gardens (nightclub), a former nightclub in Chicago
- Royal Gardens, a former residential subdivision of Kalapana, Hawaii, U.S.
- Royal Gardens, a fictional location in A Series of Unfortunate Events

== See also ==
- King's Garden (disambiguation)
- Royal Garden, a building in Maringá, Paraná, Brazil
- Royal Garden Hotel, London
- Royal Garden Plaza, a shopping mall in Pattaya, Thailand
- Category:Botanical gardens by country
