= Royal Botanic Gardens =

Royal Botanic Gardens or Royal Botanical Gardens may refer to:

== Australia ==
- Royal Botanic Gardens, Cranbourne
- Royal Botanic Gardens, Melbourne
- Royal Botanic Garden, Sydney
- Royal Tasmanian Botanical Gardens, Hobart

== Canada ==
- Royal Botanical Gardens (Ontario), Burlington and Hamilton, Ontario

== India ==
- Royal Botanic Gardens, now the Acharya Jagadish Chandra Bose Indian Botanic Garden, Calcutta

== Spain ==
- Royal Botanical Garden of Madrid

== Sri Lanka ==
- Royal Botanic Gardens, Peradeniya, Sri Lanka

== Trinidad and Tobago ==
- Royal Botanic Gardens, Trinidad, Port of Spain

== United Kingdom ==
- Royal Belfast Botanical Gardens, Northern Ireland
- Royal Botanic Garden Edinburgh, Scotland
- Royal Botanic Gardens, Kew, England

== See also ==
- Royal Gardens (disambiguation)
