= Gehenna (Vampire: The Masquerade) =

Gehenna is a 2004 role-playing game supplement published by White Wolf Publishing for Vampire: The Masquerade.

== Contents ==
Gehenna is a supplement in which the end of the campaign world is outlined, and includes four adventure scenarios.

== Publication history ==
Shannon Appelcline noted that despite the risks of radically altering a campaign setting, "White Wolf pressed on, publishing a series of preludes, then the final books: Vampire's Gehenna (2004), Werewolf's Apocalypse (2004), Mage's Ascension (2004) and World of Darkness: Time of Judgment (2004), which ended Changeling, Demon, Hunter, Kindred of the East and Mummy. The Time of Judgment books sold very well – largely on par with older books before the lines had declined – and the Old World of Darkness went out with a bang like no other in the history of the roleplaying industry."

== Reviews ==
- Pyramid
- Backstab
- Dragão Brasil #102 (Sep 2003)
- RPG Magazine #11 (Feb 2004)
- D20 #18 p. 6-8
- D20 #22 p. 8
- Coleção Dragão Brasil
