= Danish King's Garden =

Park in Tallinn, Estonia

Coordinates: 59°26′08″N 24°44′27″E

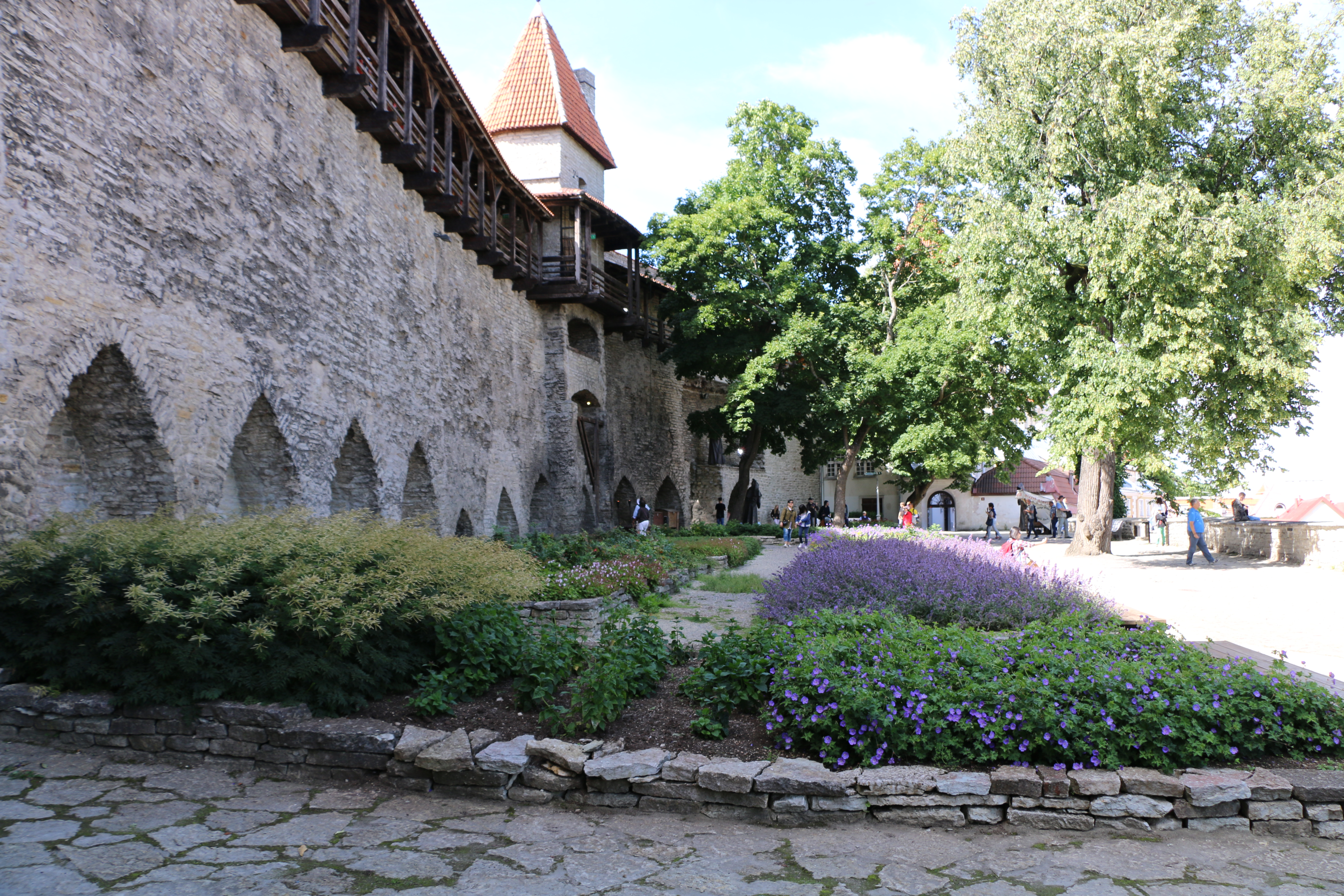
Danish King's Garden

Danish King's Garden (Estonian: Taani kuninga aed) is a park in Tallinn Old Town, Estonia.

The park is the place where the flag of Denmark, Dannebrog, according to tradition, is said to have been born. Every year on 15 June, Dannebrog or the Day of the Danish Flag is celebrated in the garden.

The park's name derives from the Danish reign, which lasted in Tallinn and northern Estonia for over a hundred years, mainly during the 13th century.
