= Al-Bustan (East Jerusalem) =

Palestinian neighbourhood in East Jerusalem

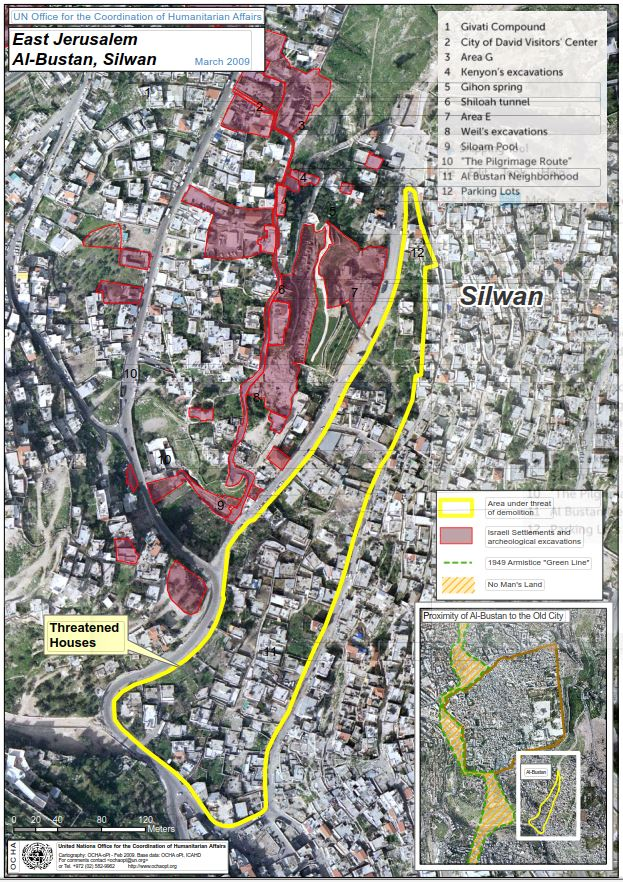
Al-Bustan is outlined in yellowCoordinates 31°46′11″N 35°14′08″E

Al-Bustan (Arabic: البستان) is a well-watered area and neighbourhood located to the south of Wadi Hilweh in the Silwan area of East Jerusalem, and currently consists of more than 100 Palestinian homes. The area is the subject of a controversial proposed Israeli development project that envisions demolishing the existing houses and creating a national park, while constructing new four-story apartment buildings around it into which the current residents would be relocated.

The area was ruled by Jordan from 1948 until 1967, when it was occupied by Israel, which then annexed it in 1980 in a move widely condemned internationally.

== History ==
Until 1967, Al-Bustan was an areas of fruit tree cultivation in Wadi Hilweh for residents of Silwan. Under the 1976 Israeli city master plan No. 9, Al-Bustan was designated as open space and construction was prohibited, allowing only for the few buildings already in place. As overcrowding worsened post-1967, Silwan residents "had no choice but to build in the valley", and new homes, built mostly since the 1980s, were constructed without Israeli permits.

The Jerusalem municipality served the demolition orders to residents of Al-Bustan in early 2015, demolishing two homes later that year. Further demolition plans were postponed due to international outcry, with Mayor Uri Lupolianski declaring that residents would be able to seek retroactive approval for their homes. The residents filed their own redevelopment plan, prepared with the planning authorities, in 2006, but it was rejected by the District Planning Committee in 2009, on the grounds of "landscape sensitivity" and "cultural and historical values". In April 2010, al-Bustan residents submitted another plan that was also rejected in June 2011 on the grounds that two plans could not be advanced in the same area.

According to the Jerusalem municipality, there were no more than four buildings in 1967, but as of 2010 it was a ghetto with 120 families living in sub-standard housing erected without permits on public parkland and "Many of the existing buildings have no electricity, water or sewage infrastructures, and many were built without proper foundations." As of 2012, there were 35 pending Al-Bustan demolition orders in 2012, with thirty-one cases in the courts and four postponed.

As of 2014, approximately 1,000 people lived in this new neighborhood, with its residents lacking official recognition and left contending with demolition orders by local authorities and unable to extend homes, lay infrastructure or build public facilities. According to the Israeli newspaper Haaretz, "No one in the neighborhood denies that the homes were built illegally", but residents assert that they were forced to build illegally on the open land because the city refused to give building permits. Residents of the houses slated for demolition acknowledge that their neighborhood is in a state of disrepair, but demand that the housing be improved, not demolished. They have demanded legal permits for their existing, unauthorized homes and vowed that "We'll never leave our homes". In 2009, residents rejected a municipality proposal for residents to voluntarily relocate to Beit Hannina to the north.

=== Planned redevelopment ===
In 2010, the municipality filed a plan to develop "King's Garden" tourism park, a planned recreational site that leverages biblical history to claim that the area is the site of the garden of the fabled King David, though this claim is disputed. The plan proposed retroactively legalizing 66 or three-quarters of the homes, while designating some of the area as a historic park. This would have relocated around twenty families within the neighbourhood, though in practice they would have had to purchase any new land, if available, as well as "meet the municipality’s strict criteria for construction permits in East Jerusalem, including a costly process of land registration".

UN Special Rapporteur Richard Falk said of the plan that "international law does not allow Israel to bulldoze Palestinian homes to make space for the mayor’s project to build a garden, or anything else."

In 2017, however, all 100 structures in Al-Bustan were facing the threat of demolition to make way for this development, though the still involved accommodating existing residents in new housing to be constructed along the edges of the park. Residents also began private negotiations with the city and in 2017, the residents and city hall agreed to the demolition of most of the buildings in the neighborhood to make way for the park on the condition that the current buildings not be torn down until building permits are issued for adjacent plots and until the new buildings are constructed.

In December 2020, several Palestinian residents in al-Bustan were served with demolition orders by the city, requiring them to demolish their own buildings or pay the cost of having the city carry out the demolition orders. In February 2021, the Jerusalem municipality asked a court to reactivate demolition orders relating to more than 70 buildings housing 1,500 Palestinians in al-Bustan.

On June 7, 2021, the Jerusalem municipality issued demolition orders affecting 13 families and 130 people, giving 21 days to evacuate and demolish their houses themselves. On June 29, Israeli authorities demolished a butcher's shop, the first in what locals fear could be a string of demolitions.

The Norwegian Refugee Council issued a statement stating "Israeli authorities must immediately stop forcibly displacing people and demolishing their homes and property" and "Under the Fourth Geneva Convention, Israel has an obligation to protect civilians under its occupation and to refrain from destroying private property." On June 8, 2021 UN Secretary-General Antonio Guterres urged Israeli authorities to stop demolitions of Palestinian properties in occupied East Jerusalem.

On 9 August 2021, a court order froze most demolition orders until February 2022 but allowed 16 homes to be razed immediately.
