= Spiritual death =

Term in various belief systems

The concept of spiritual death has varying meanings in various uses and contexts.

== Buddhism ==
Although Buddhists occasionally use the term 'spiritual death,' there is no consensus about the meaning because the Buddha himself never used the term, hence the controversy. It has crept into use in recent decades. The closest he came to it, is in the term Parābhava, meaning 'spiritual ruination.' The various ways to spiritual ruination is expounded in the Parābhava Sutta. For example, the Sutta says: ‘If a man is fond of sleep, fond of society, and does not exert himself, but is idle and ill-tempered, that is the cause of spiritual ruination.’

The Sutta concludes:

'‘Having contemplated these ruined men in the world, the wise and noble man with perfect vision of things according to reality partakes of the world of the fortunate.'

For Buddhadasa spiritual death stems from attachment to good and evil, and means dukkha, i.e. 'suffering'. He says: "Once we know about good and evil, we attach to them ... This causes dukkha [suffering] and dukkha is death, spiritual death." (ibid, p.9)

Thus, for Buddhadasa spiritual death stems from attachment to good and evil, and equals suffering; whereas for Christianity, it stems from sin, and equals either separation from God, or the death of the soul. It is hard to see, from Buddhadasa's point of view, in spiritual death, what actually dies.

Sangharakshita uses the term "spiritual death" to describe insight meditation practice. In this case, spiritual death is something good, favourable.

He says: "The term 'spiritual death' may be slightly off-putting, but it isn’t meant to suggest physical death. What ‘dies’ are all our illusions and delusions about who we are and how things are. This is usually spoken of as ‘insight practice’ (vipassana)." (ibid).

== Christianity ==
In Christian theology, spiritual death is separation from God caused by sin.

"Your sins have separated you and God" (Isaiah 59:2).

This spiritual death is alternatively regarded as the death of the soul:

"The soul that sins shall die." (Ezekiel 18:4).

== Judaism ==
Ezekiel 18:4 is translated as "The soul that sins shall die," by both Christians and Jews. But the nature of the soul in Judaism is uncertain. So how Jews understand Ezekiel is a matter of controversy.

And therefore what Spiritual Death means in Judaism is uncertain. Nonetheless, if spiritual death is the death of the soul, sin is the cause of it, whatever it is.

== Hinduism ==
Spiritual death is dealt with in the Bhagavad Gita Chapter 16, which says that those of demoniac nature engage in harmful, horrible works meant to destroy the world. They become envious of God, who is situated in their own bodies. Being the lowest among men, they are cast into demoniac life, and never approach Krishna. Gradually they sink down to the most abominable type of existence. Here death means rebirth in the demonic realm, as well as separation from God. Whether the soul is destroyed in unclear, but certainly the Hindus and Christians are united on the cause of spiritual death, namely evil conduct or sin.

== Theosophical Society ==
For theosophists, spiritual death stems from sinfulness, and equals the death of the soul, or separation between one's higher and lower nature, or between the soul and the body. Here is a quote from Blavatsky:

"While yet in the body which has lost its higher “Soul” through its vices, there is still hope for such a person. He may be still redeemed and made to turn on his material nature; in which case either an intense feeling of repentance, or one single earnest appeal to the Soul that has fled, or best of all, an active effort to mend one’s ways, may bring the Soul back again. The thread or connection is not altogether broken, so it is not yet beyond hearing a strong spiritual appeal."

And this is from Geoffrey Hodson:

"When a person deliberately and without due thought of the consequences—especially broken vows—gives up the whole enterprise of endeavoring to quicken the rate of evolutionary development for the sake of all humankind, he becomes traitorous... When a person does fall by continuing to direct attention to material goals; to assume old and undesirable habits of body; and to take pleasure in uncontrolled, sensual emotions and selfish, possessive, prideful thinking, then inevitably a curtain or veil is drawn across the hitherto gradually thinning barrier between his higher and the lower natures, thereby shutting off communication between the immortal, spiritual soul and the mortal, personal human being."

== Socrates ==
Socrates taught that whereas single acts of wrongdoing injure the soul, multiple or serious acts of wrongdoing, or those that go unpunished, threaten ultimately to ruin it.

"The most exquisite and devastating damage one can do to one's soul, then, is through wrongdoing."

== Latter-Day Saints ==
Latter-Day Saints say there are two forms of spiritual death. Firstly, humans are spiritually dead until they are redeemed:

“All mankind, by the fall of Adam being cut off from the presence of the Lord, are considered as dead, both as to things temporal and to things spiritual”

Secondly, spiritual death comes as a result of disobedience. Sins make humans unclean and unable to dwell in the presence of God.

Through the Atonement, Jesus Christ offers redemption from both types of spiritual death.

== Other views ==
Followers of Ascended Master movements such as the Theosophical Society, I AM Foundation, and Elizabeth Clare Prophet have a different definition of the second death, the final extinguishing of the identity of a soul deemed by God to be beyond redemption. In this theology, people are believed to continue to reincarnate for many lifetimes on Earth with one of two final outcomes: 1) Reunion with God in the ritual of the Ascension, like Jesus, or 2) Final judgment at the "court of the sacred fire," where the soul would be destroyed forever.

== Secular usage ==
=== Social science ===
John B. Calhoun saw the social breakdown of a population of mice given ample resources as a second death. He saw this as a metaphor for the potential fate of man in an overcrowded but resource rich environment and made reference to the second death of the Book of Revelation. Conservative Christian writers, such as Bill Perkins, have echoed this warning.

== Famous quotes ==
In his famous anti-war address "Beyond Vietnam: A Time to Break Silence," delivered 4 April 1967 at a meeting of Clergy and Laity Concerned at Riverside Church in New York City, Martin Luther King Jr. observed that "[a] nation that continues year after year to spend more money on military defense than on programs of social uplift is approaching spiritual death."

== See also ==
- Annihilationism
- Meivazhi
