= King's Garden (biblical place) =

Biblical site

The King's Garden (Hebrew: גן המלך, Gan HaMelekh) is a location mentioned in the Hebrew Bible (Nehemiah 3:15 and 2 Kings 25:4), and associated by biblical archaeologists with the Al-Bustan neighbourhood in the Silwan area of East Jerusalem.

Al-Bustan has traditionally been believed to be part of the royal gardens of the Israelite kings, though, according to B'Tselem, "the exact location and nature of the biblical garden are not known and there are no archeological or other findings in al-Bustan to suggest that this is in fact the location."

== Location ==
The only place in historical Jerusalem where water is flowing year-round, thanks to the nearby Gihon Spring, allowing for permanent growth of natural vegetation and agriculture, is at the confluence of the Kidron and the Central (aka Tyropoeon) valleys. The area known as the King's Garden is today planted with many fruit trees that are nourished by the water run-off from the Pool of Siloam.

According to Dalman, the King's Garden was irrigated originally through a canal with side openings, which led the water of the Gihon spring at the edge of the valley to the south, until Hezekiah's Tunnel created a more southern exit for the water, from which the garden could then be irrigated. According to him, this would not have looked much different from the bustān Silwān of today at the same place.

The Kidron Valley, which cuts through Silwan, was divided by its local inhabitants into three sections, proceeding from north to south; 1st Wady Sitti Mariam (Valley of My Lady Mary), 2nd Wady Fer'aun (Pharaoh's Valley), and 3rd Wady Eyûb (Valley of Job). According to PEF explorer Charles Warren, "the intermediate valley, Wady Fer'aun, signifies the valley of the king, and the region to which the name is applied is precisely that which the King's Garden of the Bible used to occupy."

== The "King's Garden" in the Hebrew Bible ==
The place is known from the Hebrew Bible as 'Gan HaMelekh', 'King's Garden'. The term is used repeatedly (2 Kings 25:4; Jeremiah 39:4; Nehemiah 3:15) and the area seems to also be referred to in Zechariah 14:10, which mentions "the royal winepresses".

== Archaeology ==
The road that traverses the garden is built over a thick wall that dates back to the Second Temple period. The same wall is what created the dam-like structure that formed the ancient Pool of Siloam, known in Arabic as Birket al-Ḥamrah. Remnants of this ancient wall were unearthed during the excavations conducted by F.J. Bliss and A.C. Dickie (1894–1897), along with other more ancient finds dating back to the Bronze Age.
