= Palestinian displacement in East Jerusalem =

East Jerusalem demographic engineering

OCHAoPT map of Palestinian communities under threat of eviction in East Jerusalem, as at 2016.

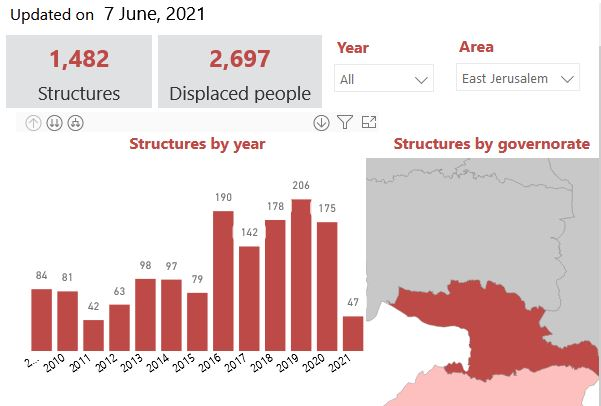
Extract from OCHA database of demolitions in East Jerusalem

Palestinian displacement in East Jerusalem is the transfer of Palestinian residents from the city due to Israeli policies aimed at an Israeli-Jewish demographic majority. (Note: Israeli policies governing Jerusalem have sought to achieve one main goal: alteration of the character, status, and composition of Jerusalem in favour of an Israeli-Jewish demographic majority, through the forcible transfer of Palestinian residents from the city.) Many Palestinian families in East Jerusalem have been affected by "forced relocation processes or been involved in lengthy legal procedures to revoke an eviction order." According to the United Nations Office for the Coordination of Humanitarian Affairs (OCHA), between a third to a half of East Jerusalem's houses do not have permits, potentially placing over 100,000 Palestinian residents of the city at risk of forced displacement and forcible transfer as a result of demolitions.

Aryeh King, a deputy mayor of Jerusalem said that the evictions were part of a municipal strategy to create "layers of Jews" throughout East Jerusalem. (Note: "But Mr. King, the deputy mayor, said “of course” they are part of a wider strategy of installing “layers of Jews” throughout East Jerusalem. That policy, Mr. King said, “is the way to secure the future of Jerusalem as a Jewish capital for the Jewish people.” “If we will not be in big numbers and if we will not be at the right places in strategic areas in East Jerusalem,” he added, then future peace negotiators “will try to divide Jerusalem and to give part of Jerusalem to our enemy.”") The United Nations Human Rights Office urged Israel to call off pending evictions in East Jerusalem, warning that its actions could amount to war crimes. “We call on Israel to immediately call off all forced evictions,” UN rights office spokesman Rupert Colville. International humanitarian law prohibits the confiscation of private property and that evictions of the Palestinian families could constitute a war crime. Human Rights Watch says the government enforces policy to "maintain the domination by Jewish Israelis over Palestinians".

== Background ==
Traditionally land was held in communal ownership (musha). A combination of the effects of an Ottoman land reform enacted in 1858 together with the ensuing penetration of modern capital investment began to erode much of customary land rights. The pace of change increased when Great Britain became the Mandatory power in Palestine. The Balfour Declaration (1917) had undertaken to ensure the establishment of a national home for Jews, and, with the passing of a Land Transfer Ordinance in 1921, which severed the customary link between land occupancy and land ownership, the World Zionist Organization, through the Jewish National Fund (JNF) and the Jewish Agency for Israel (1929), the purchase of land, especially from absentee Lebanese, Syrian and Egyptian entrepreneurs, carried with it the possibility of evicting its tenants. By 1930 roughly 10% of the country's rural population were tenants, increasingly vulnerbale to eviction.

In 1948, Palestinians lost an estimated 7,000,000 dunams of property redefined as Israeli land, with 750,000 of them also displaced from their homes, and about 400 Palestinian towns and villages were depopulated, in areas which fell under Israeli control. In West Jerusalem the overwhelming mass of the wealthy Palestinian community, some 28,000, of which only roughly 750 (mostly Greeks and Christians) were permitted to remain, fled or was expelled and their property was ransacked, subsequently confiscated and distributed to Jews. At the same time, on the advice of the Haganah and with a subsequent recommendation by the British authorities, two small communities of Jews were evacuated from Sheikh Jarrah and, in compensation given homes in West Jerusalem that had been owned by Palestinians. 10,000 mostly fully furnished Palestinian homes in the western sector of Jerusalem alone were occupied and their original owners and Palestinians with property in other parts of Mandatory Palestine and what later became Israel are denied the right to reclaim their property. In 1970, on the other hand, Israel enacted a law to allow Jews to reclaim property which they owned in East Jerusalem, despite having already been given expropriated Palestinian-owned property in compensation. This asymmetry has been pointed out by numerous observers. (Note: "The asymmetry of Israeli legislation can be seen when juxtaposing the provisions of the Israeli legislation regarding Palestinian absentee property within the Green Line boundaries with the Israeli legislation regarding properties in East Jerusalem owned by Jews prior to 1948. As noted previously, Palestinians who owned property on the western side of the Green Line (including West Jerusalem) prior to 1948 cannot, in most cases, reclaim their property. This property has been transferred, in accordance with the APL, to the Custodian of Absentee Property, who in turn sold it to the Development Authority, which, in many cases, then transferred the property to Jewish Israelis. The general rule – according to the APL and court rulings – is that this property should not be returned to its previous owners. Article 28 of the APL, which constitutes an exception to this rule, allows the Custodian to use his discretion to consider whether to release property already vested in the Custodian. The Custodian's discretion under Article 28 of the APL is limited to those cases where a special committee, formed in accordance with Article 29 of the APL, recommends that he release the property. The 1970 Law, however, provides a wholly different approach. According to the 1970 Law, once the pre-1948 owners of particular property in East Jerusalem establish that they were indeed the true owners of the property, the Custodian General must release the property to them. Israel's 1970 Law not only decrees that this property – as opposed to property belonging to Palestinian absentees – should be released to its previous owners, but also provides that the Custodian General cannot even exercise any discretion on the subject. He is obliged to hand the property back to the owners. Israeli Jews who abandoned their property in East Jerusalem in 1948 received alternate property in West Jerusalem from the State of Israel as compensation. In most cases, this property was previously owned by Palestinians prior to 1948. According to the 1970 Law, these Jews may also reacquire rights in property they previously owned in East Jerusalem despite the fact that they have already been compensated for the loss of this property.")

This arrangement does not exist in the rest of the West Bank, as the Israeli government decided that it would create tension, risk public order and lead to equivalent and much more numerous claims by West Bank Palestinians to reclaim their property in Israel. (Note: "A completely different regime applies to property owned by Jews prior to 1948 and located in parts of the West Bank that were not annexed to Israel in 1967. Following the Israeli occupation of the West Bank in 1967, the authorization to administer and manage property in these areas came under the responsibility of the Custodian of Government and Abandoned Property of the Israeli Civil Administration.136 The current stance of the Israeli Civil Administration137 with regard to this property is that it should not be released to the pre-1948 owners. They base this position, presented by State representatives in cases before the Israeli High Court of Justice, inter alia, on Israel’s obligation, as the occupying power, to maintain public order in the occupied territory. The State added that releasing this property to the pre-1948 owners may lead to a series of claims by Palestinian refugees to reacquire their property left behind in Israel in 1948. Since, according to Israeli law, these claims would most likely be rejected, it may lead to an increase in disputes over land in the region and, as a result, to an increase in tension.138 The High Court of Justice has, to date, upheld this position.")

== Timeline ==
On June 8, 2021, UN Secretary-General António Guterres urged Israeli authorities to stop demolitions of Palestinian properties in occupied East Jerusalem.

On 30 June 2021 a US Department of State spokesperson said "We believe it is important to refrain from any steps that may increase tensions and make diplomatic agreements more difficult, and this also applies to home demolitions".

On 5 July 2021, a European Union statement concerning developments in Silwan and Sheikh Jarrah said that "Israel’s settlement policy is illegal under international law" and that "Unilateral actions taken in that context, such as forced transfers, evictions, demolitions and confiscations of homes will only escalate an already tense environment and lead to further violence and human suffering. The Israeli authorities should immediately cease these activities and provide adequate permits for legal construction and development of Palestinian communities."

On July 28, 2021, Ir Amim Executive Director Dr. Yudith Oppenheimer briefed the United Nations Security Council about displacement of the Palestinian communities Sheikh Jarrah, Batn al-Hawa and al-Bustan in Silwan, and al-Walaja.

On 30 August 2021, Special Coordinator Tor Wennesland briefed the Security Council and stated "I urge Israel to cease the demolition and seizure of Palestinian property throughout the occupied West Bank, including East Jerusalem, in line with its obligations under international humanitarian law."

In the week ending 15 October 2021, planned settlements have been advanced for Givat HaMatos, E1, Atarot and Har Homa, all four plans previously announced by the Netanyahu government February 2020 after years of being frozen because of international objections. According to Ir Amim the plans are designed to predetermine the outcome of any negotiated political resolution. The US State Department said it was formulating a response.

In January, 2022, Israel indefinitely postponed debate on the E1 area. On 20 January 2022, in a statement, France, Germany, Italy and Spain urged Israeli authorities to stop new construction in East Jerusalem. They said that hundreds of new buildings "constitute an additional obstacle to the two-state solution," and would further disconnect the occupied West Bank from East Jerusalem. EU spokesperson Peter Stano pointed to a Jerusalem municipality decision to "advance a plan for the construction of more than 1,450 settlement-housing units" and said that this "undermines the possibility of Jerusalem serving as the future capital of both States." The United Nations Special Coordinator for the Middle East Peace Process Tor Wennesland referred to four building plans being advanced and said that "all settlements are illegal under international law and remain a substantial obstacle to peace."

== National parks and settlements ==
The creation of Israeli settlements in Palestinian neighborhoods and expropriation of land for roads, archaeological excavations, tourism projects, and national parks has been used since the late 1980s to increase Israeli presence in East Jerusalem. The Israeli military order (IMO) regarding Nature Protection (Judea and Samaria) (No. 363), 5730 – 1969, governs use of areas designated as nature reserves, based on similar Israeli laws. According to a European Union Heads of Mission report, "East Jerusalem is the only place where Israeli national parks are declared on populated neighbourhoods,"

== International law ==
The international community considers East Jerusalem to be Palestinian territory held under Israeli occupation. Israel effectively annexed the territory and considers it part of its capital city, though this move has been rejected by the international community. The Office of the United Nations High Commissioner for Human Rights (OHCHR) has called on Israel to stop all forced evictions of Palestinians from Sheikh Jarrah, saying that if carried out the expulsions of the Palestinians would violate Israel's responsibilities under international law which prohibit the transfer of civilians in to or out of occupied territory by the occupying power. A spokesman for the OHCHR said that such transfers may constitute a "war crime". Human rights organizations have been critical of Israeli efforts to remove Palestinians from Sheikh Jarrah, with Human Rights Watch releasing a statement saying that the disparate rights between Palestinian and Jewish residents of East Jerusalem "underscores the reality of apartheid that Palestinians in East Jerusalem face." Israeli human rights group estimate that over 1,000 Palestinian families are at risk of eviction in East Jerusalem.

The European Union considers that Israel is "actively pursuing the illegal annexation" of East Jerusalem. According to the EU, Israeli actions increase Jewish Israeli presence in East Jerusalem and weaken the Palestinian community in the city. The EU has raised its concerns over Israeli house demolitions in East Jerusalem using diplomatic channels. According to the EU, demolitions are "illegal under international law, serve no obvious purpose, have severe humanitarian effects, and fuel bitterness and extremism". The EU says that the fourth Geneva convention prevents an occupying power extending its jurisdiction to occupied territory, such as East Jerusalem, which the Palestinians claim as the capital of their future state. In 2011, EU envoys in the Middle East reported to Brussels that various Israeli policies amounted to "systematically undermining the Palestinian presence" in Jerusalem. According to the United Kingdom, "attempts by Israel to alter the character or demography of East Jerusalem are unacceptable and extremely provocative."

Richard Falk, Special Rapporteur for the UN on the occupied Palestinian territories, said in 2011 that "the continued pattern of settlement expansion in East Jerusalem combined with forcible eviction of long residing Palestinians are creating an intolerable situation that can only be described, in its cumulative impact, as a form of ethnic cleansing". Falk said that Israel's actions reveal systematic discrimination against Palestinian residents of the city, and recommended that the International Court of Justice assess allegations that Israel's occupation of the West Bank, including East Jerusalem, possesses elements of apartheid and ethnic cleansing.

According to an April 2021 report by Human Rights Watch, "Beyond formal state confiscation, discriminatory laws and policies enable settler and settler organizations to take possession of Palestinian homes, evict the Palestinian landowners, and transfer their property to Jewish owners in East Jerusalem neighborhoods."

== Settler organizations ==
In the 1990s and 2000s U.S. philanthropy became more partisan, donating to settler organizations and donors recruited to acquire properties for Jews in Arab sections of East Jerusalem.

== Evictions ==
The data for the year 2016 has been tabulated as follows:

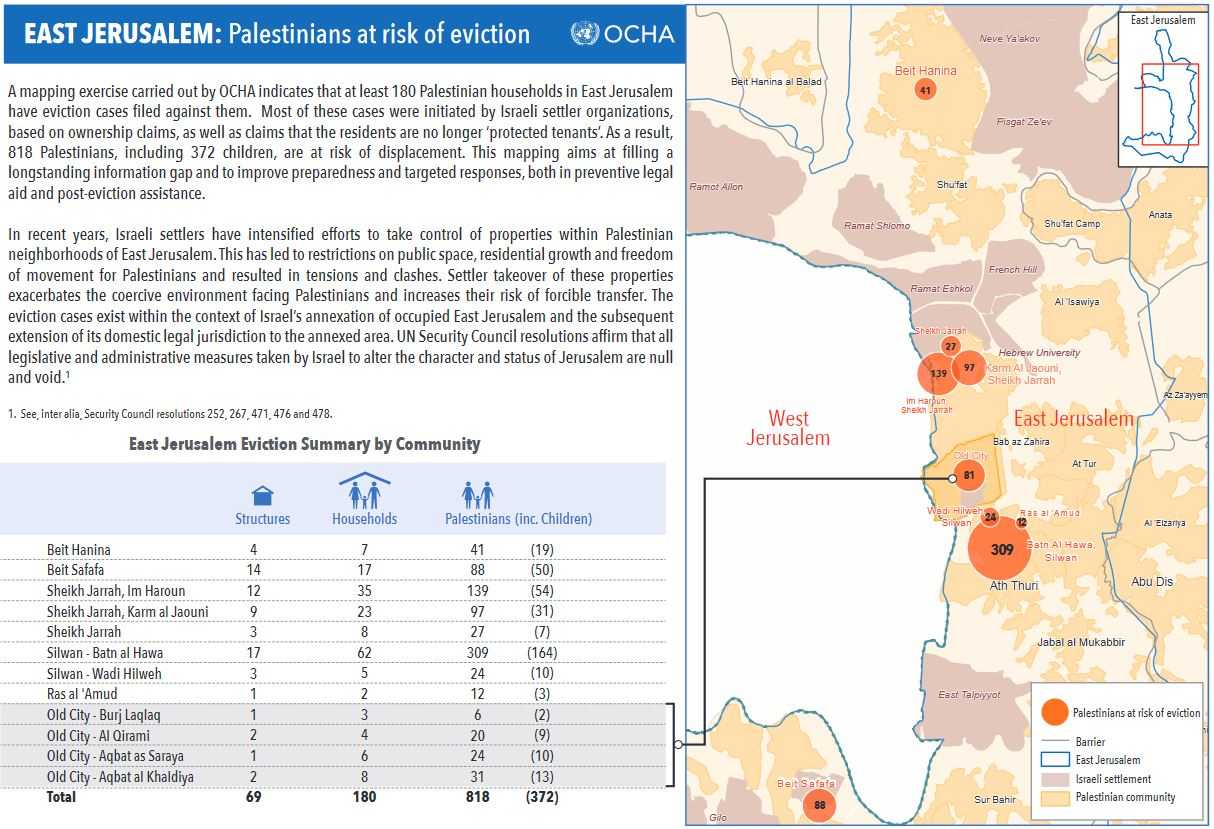
2016 OCHA analysis of Palestinians at risk of eviction in East Jerusalem

As of May 29, 2021 in East Jerusalem, there are 218 Palestinian households (970 persons) with eviction cases. Sheikh Jarrah is 8(75) and Batn al-Hawa (Silwan) is 7(44). Palestinians have called the attempted evictions "ethnic cleansing". (Note: 'Moreover, the delegation observed that there is an asymmetry in the way the Israeli courts treat the question of pre-1948 property rights. While the courts have been willing to uphold claims by Jewish organisations in relation to property in Sheikh Jarrah allegedly owned by Jewish families before 1948, similar claims by the Palestinian residents of Sheikh Jarrah in relation to lands which their families owned in what is now the State of Israel would not be entertained. Such asymmetry is simply not justifiable.")

== Demolitions ==
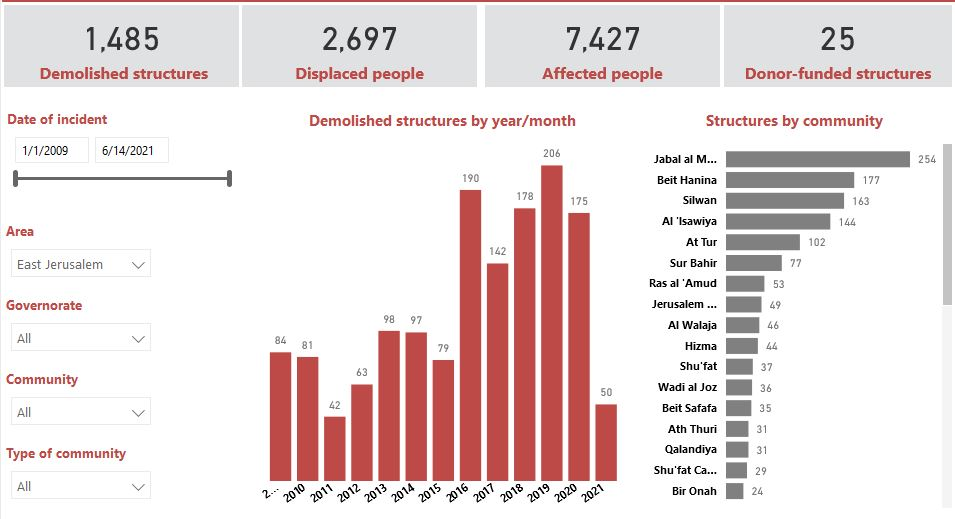
Breakdown of East jerusalem demolitions by community

According to Peace Now, about 20,000 Palestinian homes are under threat of demolition because their owners built them without obtaining planning permission, which is often denied to Palestinians.

In 2020, the 170 demolitions in East Jerusalem was the second-highest number of demolitions after 2016 since the UN began recording in 2009.

== See also ==
- 2021 Israel–Palestine crisis
- Sheikh Jarrah controversy
- City of David (Silwan)

== Sources ==
- Adler, Raya (May 1988). "The Tenants of Wadi Hawarith: Another View of the Land Question in Palestine". International Journal of Middle East Studies. 20 (2): 197–220. doi:10.1017/S0020743800033936. JSTOR 162960. S2CID 163346325.
- House Demolitions and Forced Evictions in Silwan:Israel's Transfer of Palestinians from Jerusalem (PDF) (Report). Al-Haq. 2020. Archived (PDF) from the original on 24 November 2022.
- Aronson, Geoffrey (Winter 2011). "Settlement Monitor". Journal of Palestine Studies. 40 (2): 160–169. doi:10.1525/jps.2011.xl.2.160. JSTOR 10.1525/jps.2011.xl.2.160. Archived from the original on 6 May 2022.
- Ben-Hillel, Yotam (May 2013). The Absentee Property Law and its Implementation in East Jerusalem: A Legal Guide and Analysis (PDF) (Report). Norwegian Refugee Council. Archived (PDF) from the original on 7 January 2023.
- Benvenisti, Eyal (4 March 2019). Legal Dualism: The Absorption Of The Occupied Territories Into Israel. Taylor & Francis. pp. 61–. ISBN 978-0-429-71447-4.
- Displacement and the 'Jerusalem Question': An Overview of the Negotiations over East Jerusalem and Developments on the Ground (PDF) (Report). Norwegian Refugee Council. April 2015. Archived (PDF) from the original on 15 April 2023.
- Dumper, Michael (Summer 1992). "Israeli Settlement in the Old City of Jerusalem". Journal of Palestine Studies. 21 (4): 32–53. doi:10.2307/2537662. JSTOR 2537662.
- Golan-Agnon, Daphna (2020). Teaching Palestine on an Israeli University Campus: Unsettling Denial. Anthem Press. ISBN 978-1-785-27502-9.
- Green, Penny; Smith, Amelia (Spring 2016). "Evicting Palestine". State Crime Journal. 5 (5): 81–108. doi:10.13169/statecrime.5.1.0081. JSTOR 10.13169/statecrime.5.1.0081.
- Hareuveni, Eyal (May 2011). Dispossession & Exploitation, Israel's policy in the Jordan Valley & northern Dead Sea (PDF) (Report). B'Tselem. p. 23. Archived (PDF) from the original on 6 August 2021 – via ReliefWeb.
- Holmes, Oliver (27 April 2021). "Israel is committing the crime of apartheid, rights watchdog says". the Guardian. Archived from the original on 17 May 2023.
- Jadallah, Dina (Winter 2014). "Colonialist Construction in the Urban Space of Jerusalem". Middle East Journal. 68 (1): 77–98. doi:10.3751/68.1.14. JSTOR 43698562. S2CID 144192838. Archived from the original on 6 May 2022.
- Kingsley, Patrick (8 May 2021). "Evictions in Jerusalem Become Focus of Israeli-Palestinian Conflict". New York Times. Archived from the original on 9 May 2021.
- Krystall, Nathan (Winter 1998). "The De-Arabization of West Jerusalem 1947-50". Journal of Palestine Studies. 27 (2): 5–22. doi:10.2307/2538281. JSTOR 2538281. Archived from the original on 27 February 2023.
- Magid, Jacob (7 May 2021). "UN: Pending Israeli evictions in East Jerusalem could be a 'war crime'". The Times of Israel. Archived from the original on 24 May 2021.
- McCarthy, Rory (7 March 2009). "Israel annexing East Jerusalem, says EU". The Guardian. Archived from the original on 28 June 2018.
- Meir, Margalit (2018). "9.Silent Forced Migrations in Twenty-First-Century Jerusalem". In Linhard, Tabea; Parsons, Timothy H. (eds.). Mapping Migration, Identity, and Space. Springer International. ISBN 978-3-319-77955-3. Archived from the original on 10 June 2021.
- "East Jerusalem: Palestinians at risk of eviction". OCHA. 3 November 2016. Archived from the original on 10 June 2021.
- "High numbers of Demolitions: the ongoing threats of demolition for Palestinian residents of East Jerusalem". OCHA. 15 January 2018. Archived from the original on 16 January 2023.
- "Record number of demolitions, including self-demolitions, in East Jerusalem in April 2019". OCHA. 14 May 2019. Archived from the original on 12 February 2023.
- Ofran, Hagit (June 2020). Annex and Dispossess Use of the Absentees' Property Law to Dispossess Palestinians of their Property in East Jerusalem (PDF) (Report). Peace Now. Archived (PDF) from the original on 17 May 2023.
- Rempel, Terry (Autumn 1997). "The Significance of Israel's Partial Annexation of East Jerusalem". Middle East Journal. 54 (4): 520–534. JSTOR 4329118.
- Reiter, Yitzhak; Lehrs, Lior (2010). The Sheikh Jarrah Affair:The Strategic Implications of Jewish Settlement in an Arab Neighborhood in East Jerusalem (PDF). Jerusalem Institute for Israel Studies. Archived (PDF) from the original on 21 September 2020.
- Sergides, Marina (2012). "Housing in East Jerusalem". No. 60. Socialist Lawyer. pp. 14–17. doi:10.13169/socialistlawyer.60.0014. JSTOR 10.13169/socialistlawyer.60.0014. Archived from the original on 7 May 2023.
- Shehadeh, Raja (11 May 2021). "Sheikh Jarrah and the Renewed Israeli-Palestinian Violence". New Yorker. Archived from the original on 15 May 2021.
- Insiders' Jerusalem – Special Edition Large-scale Displacement: from Sheikh Jarrah to Silwan (Report). Terrestrial Jerusalem. 20 May 2021. Archived from the original on 10 June 2021.
- Zink, Valerie (January–March 2009). "A quiet transfer". Contemporary Arab Affairs. 2 (1): 122–133. doi:10.1080/17550910802576148. JSTOR 48599664. Archived from the original on 6 May 2022.
- Hadeel, Abu Hussein (October 2016). Architecture of Exclusion: The Struggle for Land and Legitimacy of Palestinians Under Israeli Law (PDF) (PhD). NUI Galway. Archived (PDF) from the original on 23 June 2021.
- Rempel, Terry; Prettitore, Paul (2010). "Restitution and compensation for Palestinian refugees and displaced persons: Principles, practical considerations, and compliance". In Akram, Susan; Dumper, M.; Lynk, Michael; Scobbie, Iain (eds.). International Law and the Israeli-Palestinian Conflict: A Rights-Based Approach to Middle East Peace. Routledge. ISBN 978-1-136-85097-4.
- Joint Urgent Appeal to the United Nations Special Procedures on Forced Evictions in East Jerusalem (PDF) (Report). The Palestinian Human Rights Organisation Council, The Civic Coalition for Palestinian Rights in Jerusalem, Community Action Center, Al-Quds University, Cairo Institute for Human Rights Studies. 10 March 2021. Archived (PDF) from the original on 7 May 2023.
- Kingsley2, Patrick (7 June 2021). "A House Divided: A Palestinian, a Settler and the Struggle for East Jerusalem". The New York Times. Archived from the original on 25 May 2023.
- Husseini, Ibrahim (31 December 2020). "Israel orders wave of new house demolitions in Silwan, Jerusalem". Archived from the original on 29 July 2021.
- Klein, Menachem (2014). Lives in Common: Arabs and Jews in Jerusalem, Jaffa and Hebron. Oxford University Press. ISBN 978-0-19-939626-9.
- Hoffman, Valerie J. (28 February 2019). Making the New Middle East: Politics, Culture, and Human Rights. Syracuse University Press. ISBN 978-0-8156-5457-5.
- Sasson, Theodore (29 November 2013). The New American Zionism. NYU Press. ISBN 978-0-8147-2493-4.
