= I Witness Silwan =

Public art installation in East Jerusalem

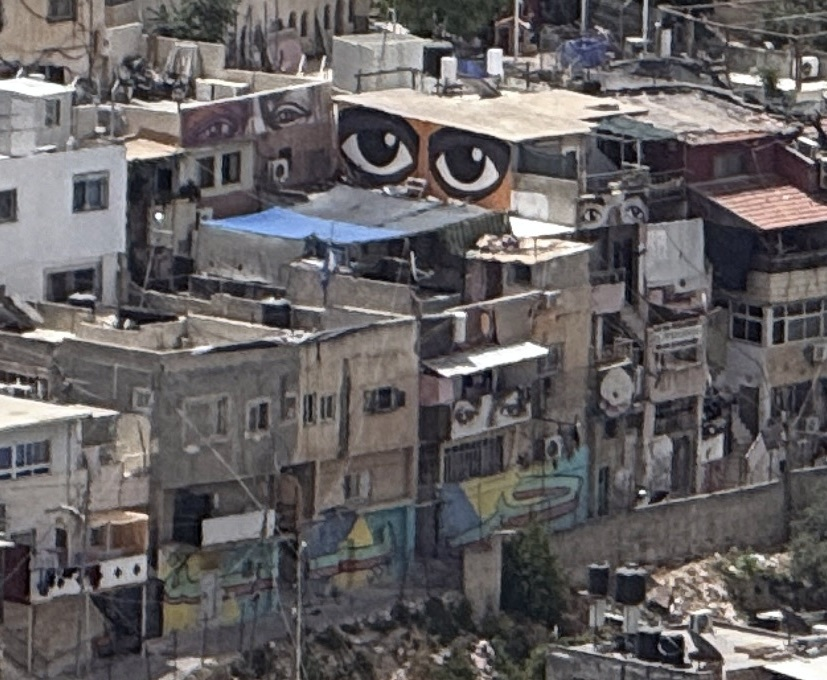
Murals painted on houses in Batn al-Hawa marked for demolition or eviction

I Witness Silwan is a community public art installation in East Jerusalem. It started in 2015 as a collaboration between the Madaa-Silwan Creative Center and Susan Greene and involves Palestinian and American artists. The installation consists of artworks across the district of Silwan, particularly on Palestinian houses marked for demolition or eviction. I Witness Silwan depicts human eyes facing towards Jerusalem, interspersed with paintings of Palestinian national symbols. By 2022, the artists had created over 2,000 feet (610 m) of artworks.

== Silwan ==
Silwan is an area of East Jerusalem inhabited by Palestinians. Many of the artworks that make up I Witness Silwan are located in the Batn al-Hawa area of Silwan where they are painted on the walls of houses marked for demolition or whose residents face eviction. A 2024 press release from the Office of the United Nations High Commissioner for Human Rights described legal cases brought by Israeli settlers against 87 Palestinian families living in Batn al-Hawa as an attempt "to uproot Palestinians from their homes, take over their property and implant Israeli settlers in the heart of Palestinian neighbourhoods in East Jerusalem". Settler group Ateret Cohanim have been active in pursuing the evictions.

== Development ==
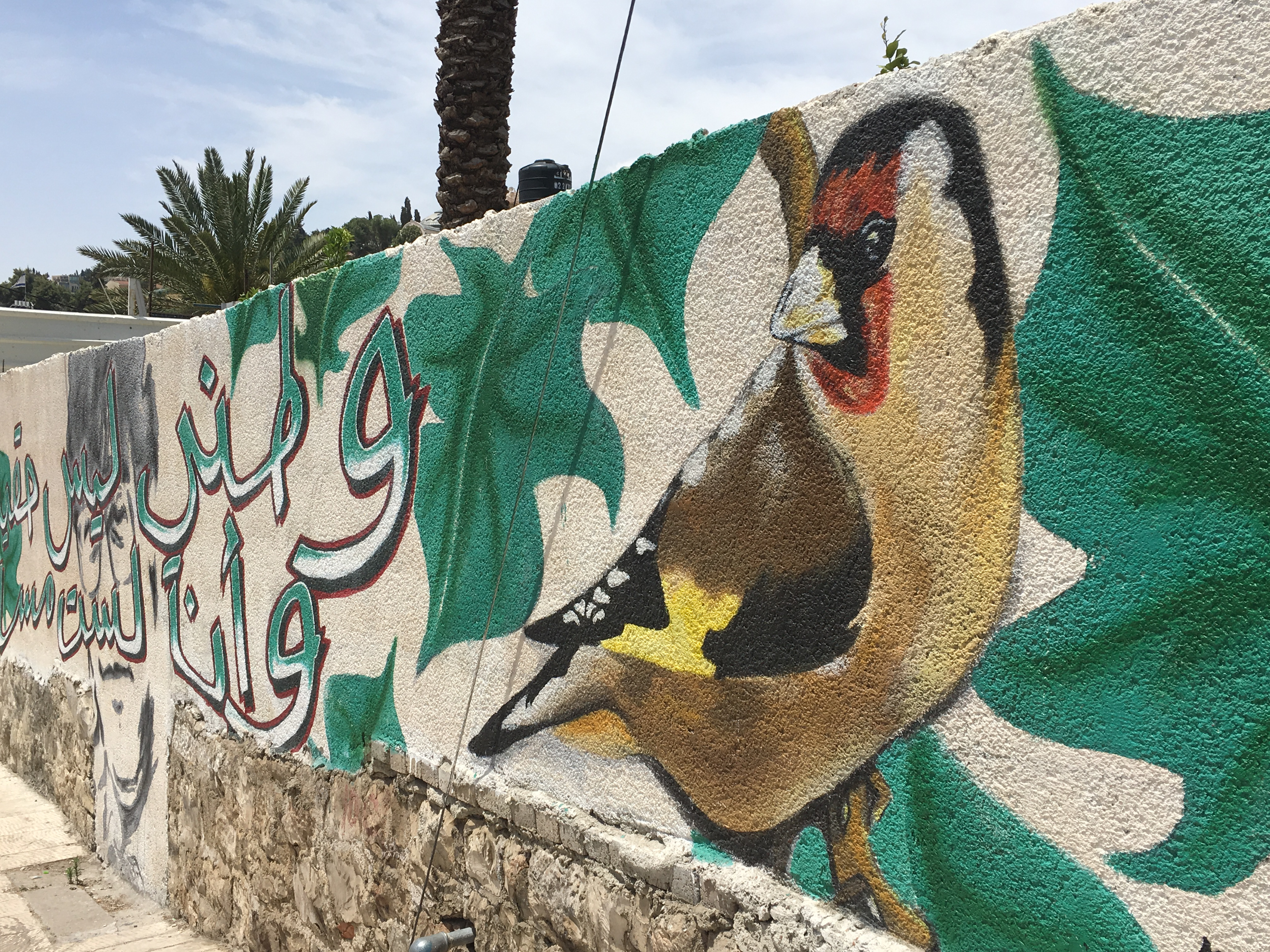
The I Witness Silwan murals include national symbols of Palestine such as the goldfinch. The first was painted on Wadi Hilwa Street and is accompanied by Arabic text reading "My homeland is not a suitcase and I am no traveler".

I Witness Silwan was developed by Susan Greene, a Jewish-American artist who has been involved in public art activities in Palestine since 1998. The public art project began as a collaboration in 2015 between Art Forces (Greene's organisation), the Madaa-Silwan Creative Center, and the Wadi Hilwa Information Centre. Palestinian and American artists have been involved in creating the artworks. In a 2021 interview Greene said "The images of eyes are created by Palestinian and international artists and the Silwan community to say the world is watching. At the same time the eyes, seen across the city, witness the ethnic cleansing taking place."

By 2022, the artworks covered more than 2,000 feet (610 m) of wallspace. Residents of Silwan report that paintings of Palestinian flags and the word Palestine have been removed, although as of 2022 the murals were mostly intact.

== Content ==
The installation consists of artworks across the district of Silwan. Various approaches are used, with some murals painted directly onto the walls, and others involving vinyl banners. I Witness Silwan depicts human eyes facing towards Jerusalem, interspersed with paintings of Palestinian national symbols including goldfinches. The first goldfinch mural was painted on Wadi Hilwa Street alongside a quote from Palestinian poet Mahmoud Darwish reading "My homeland is not a suitcase and I am no traveler". Haaretz reported that the Jerusalem Municipality "sought to remove the mural on grounds of incitement", but abandoned such efforts.

The people depicted are a mixture of public figures and people who have been victims of violence, including figures such as Sigmund Freud and Eyad al-Hallaq. The choice of subjects such as Che Guevara and George Floyd is intended to "draw deliberate parallels between the Palestinian struggle and other civil rights movements worldwide".

== See also ==
- Palestinian art
- Saved Treasures of Gaza: 5000 Years of History – 2025 exhibition of archaeological artefacts found in the Gaza Strip

== Bibliography ==
- Greene, Susan (Summer 2020). "I Witness Silwan: Who is Watching Whom?". Jerusalem Quarterly (82): 154–167. doi:10.70190/jq.I82.p154.
- Stokes, Joel (Autumn 2022). ""Silence," Heritage, and Sumud in Silwan, East Jerusalem". Jerusalem Quarterly (91): 105–120. doi:10.70190/jq.I91.p105.
