= Silwan =

Palestinian neighborhood in East Jerusalem

Coordinates: 31.77°N 35.237°E

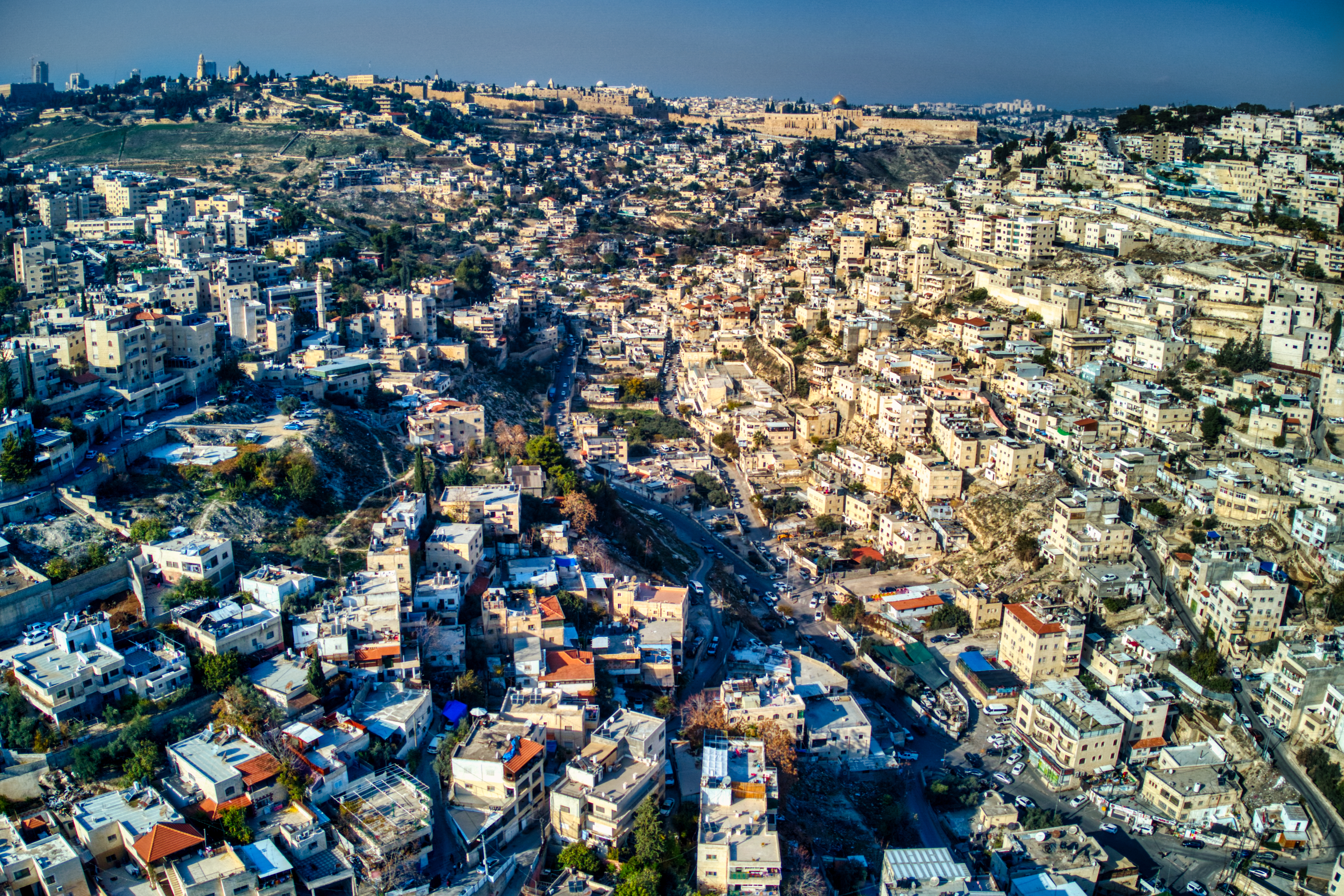
Center of Silwan (2022)

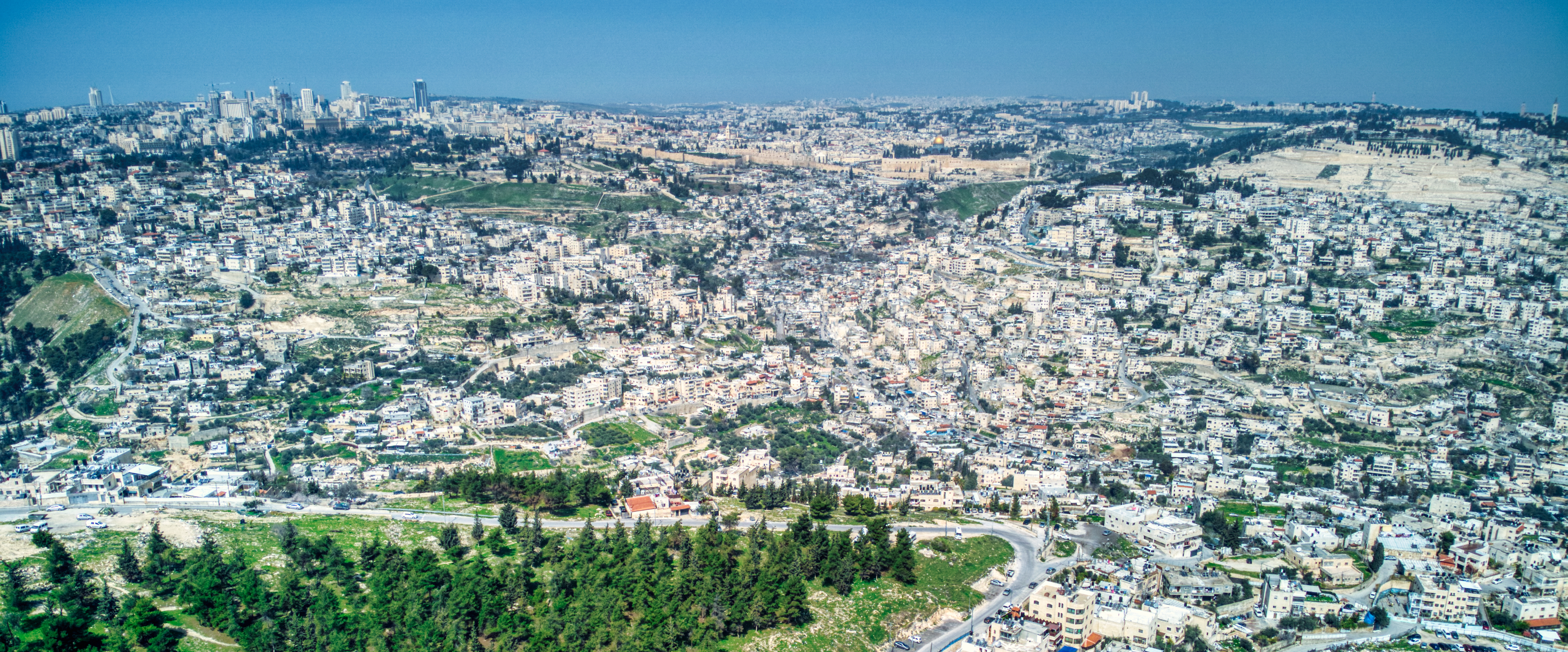
Wide view of Silwan (2022)

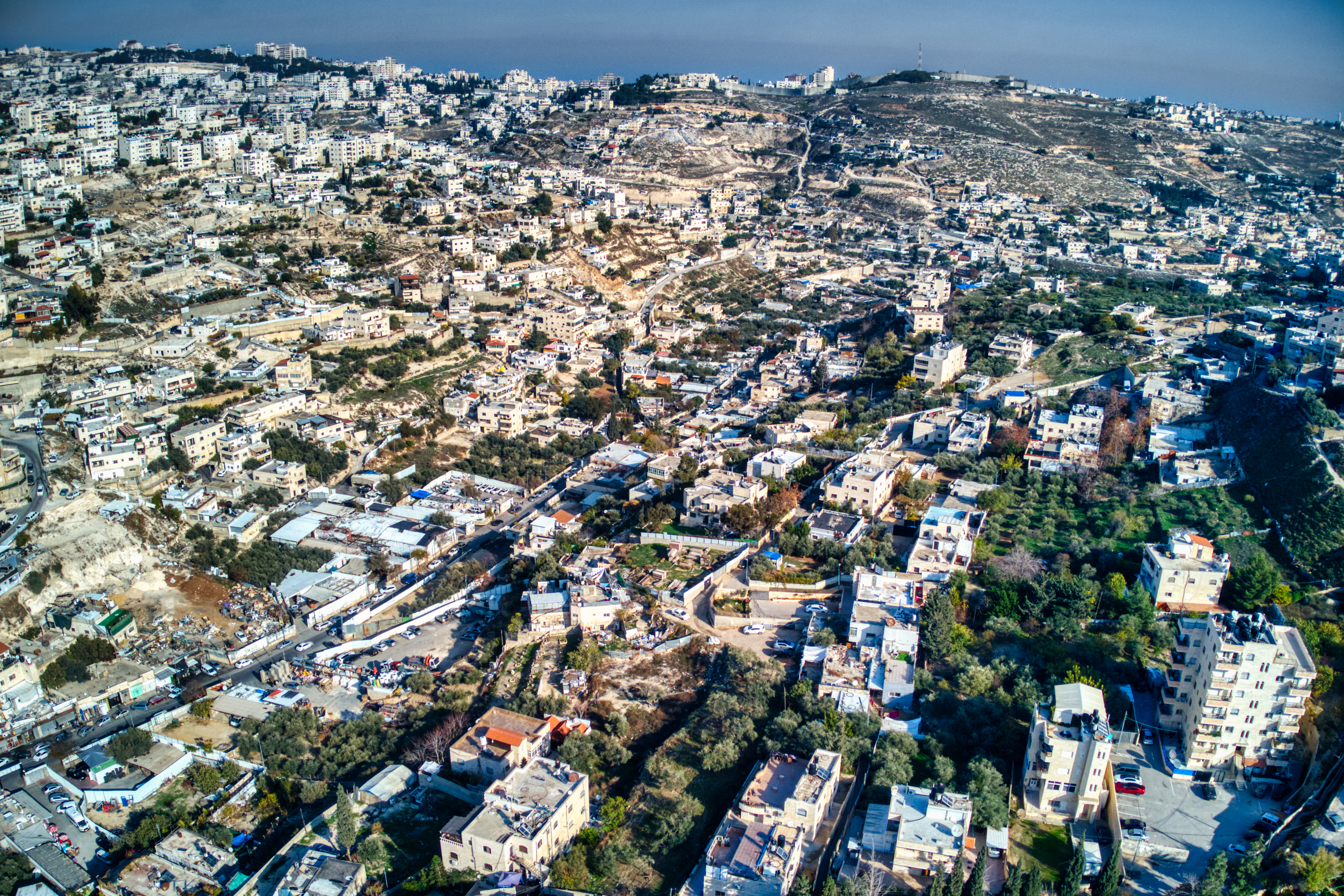
Southern part of Silwan (2022)

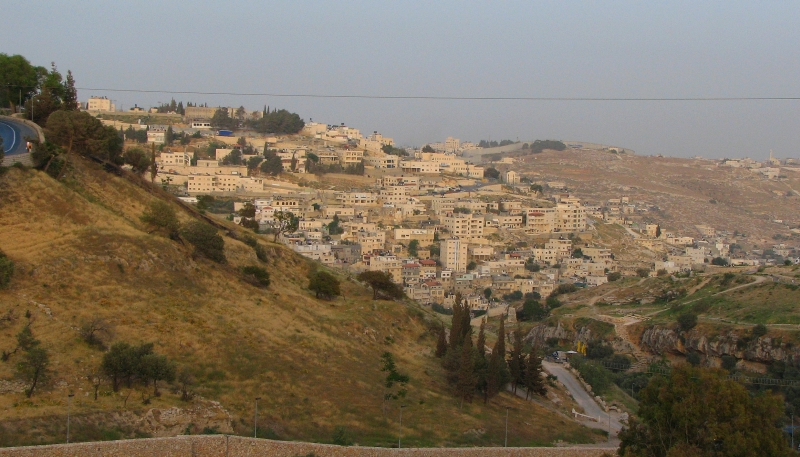
View of Silwan (2008)

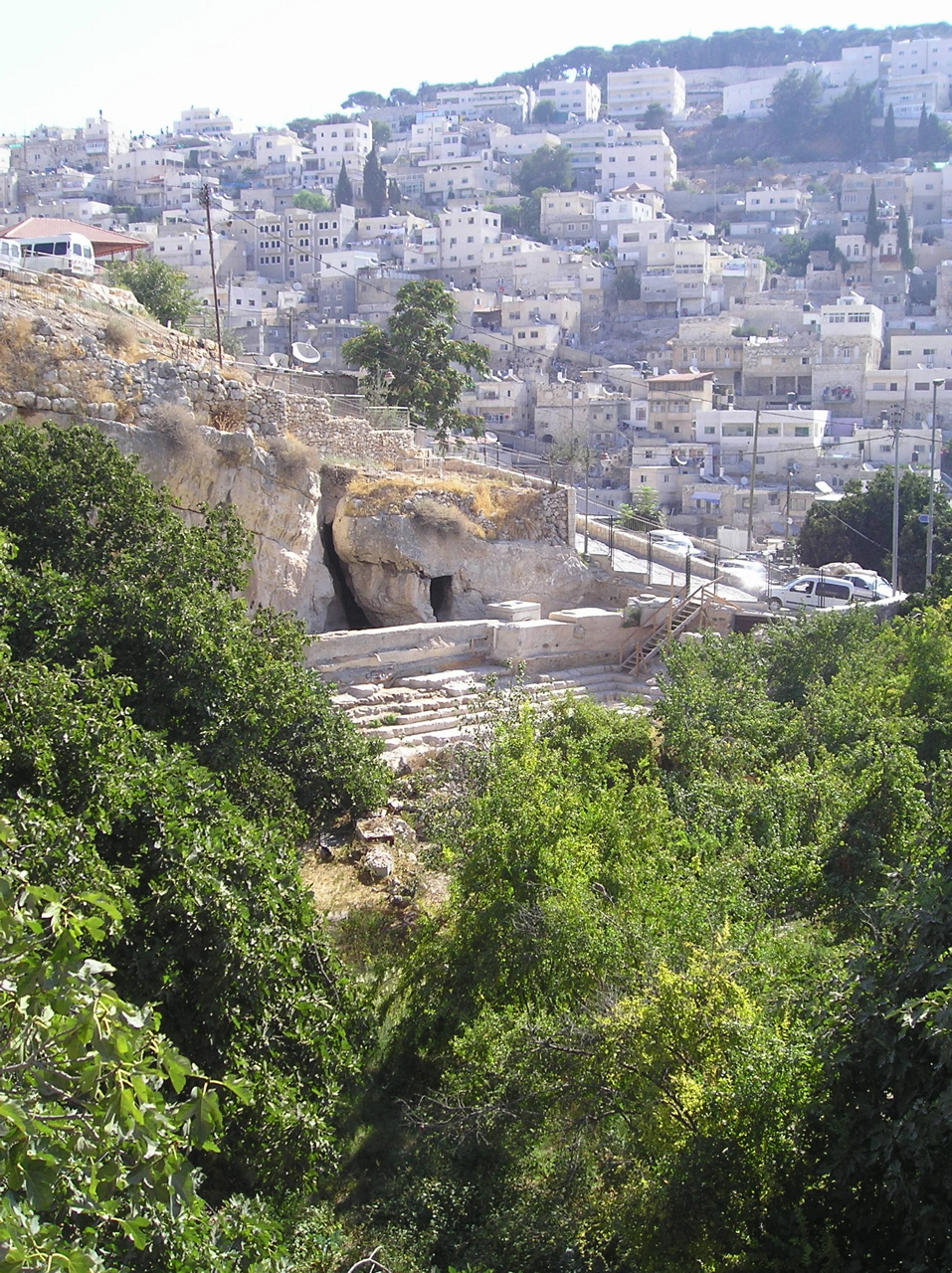
Pool of Siloam

Silwan or Siloam (Arabic: سلوان, romanized: Silwan; Greek: Σιλωάμ, romanized: Siloam; Hebrew: כְּפַר הַשִּׁילוֹחַ, romanized: Kfar ha-Shiloaḥ) is a predominantly Palestinian district in East Jerusalem, on the southeastern outskirts of the current Old City of Jerusalem. It was the source of water for the Pool of Siloam within larger boundaries of the ancient walled city of Jerusalem, mentioned in the Hebrew Bible and the New Testament. In the latter it is the location of Jesus healing the man blind from birth. Medieval Silwan began as a farming village, dating back to the 7th century according to local traditions, while the earliest mention of the village is from the year 985. Over many centuries, the village grew until it became an urban neighborhood of Jerusalem in the 20th century.

In 1947, the UN voted for Silwan to be part of an international city of Jerusalem called a Corpus separatum. After the 1948 war, the village came under Jordanian rule and was annexed by Jordan. Its rule lasted until the 1967 Six-Day War. It was annexed by Israel in 1980. Neither Israel's or Jordan's annexations were recognized by most countries. Most countries view Silwan as occupied by Israel. Silwan is administered as part of the Jerusalem Municipality. In 2016, Haaretz reported that the Israeli government and the settler organization Ateret Cohanim were working together to evict Palestinians living on property registered as part of the Hekdesh trust. The trust owned land lived on by a Yemenite Jewish community in an area of Silwan now mostly referred to as Batn al-Hawa. Israeli law allows land to be reclaimed if documentation of transfer cannot be found. In 2021, the Jordanian government turned over "All the documents [they held] on property and land in Jerusalem" to the Palestinian Authority to prove cases of ownership transfer.

Depending on how the neighborhood is defined, the Palestinian residents in Silwan number 20,000 to 50,000 while there are about 500 to 2,800 Jews.

== Geography ==
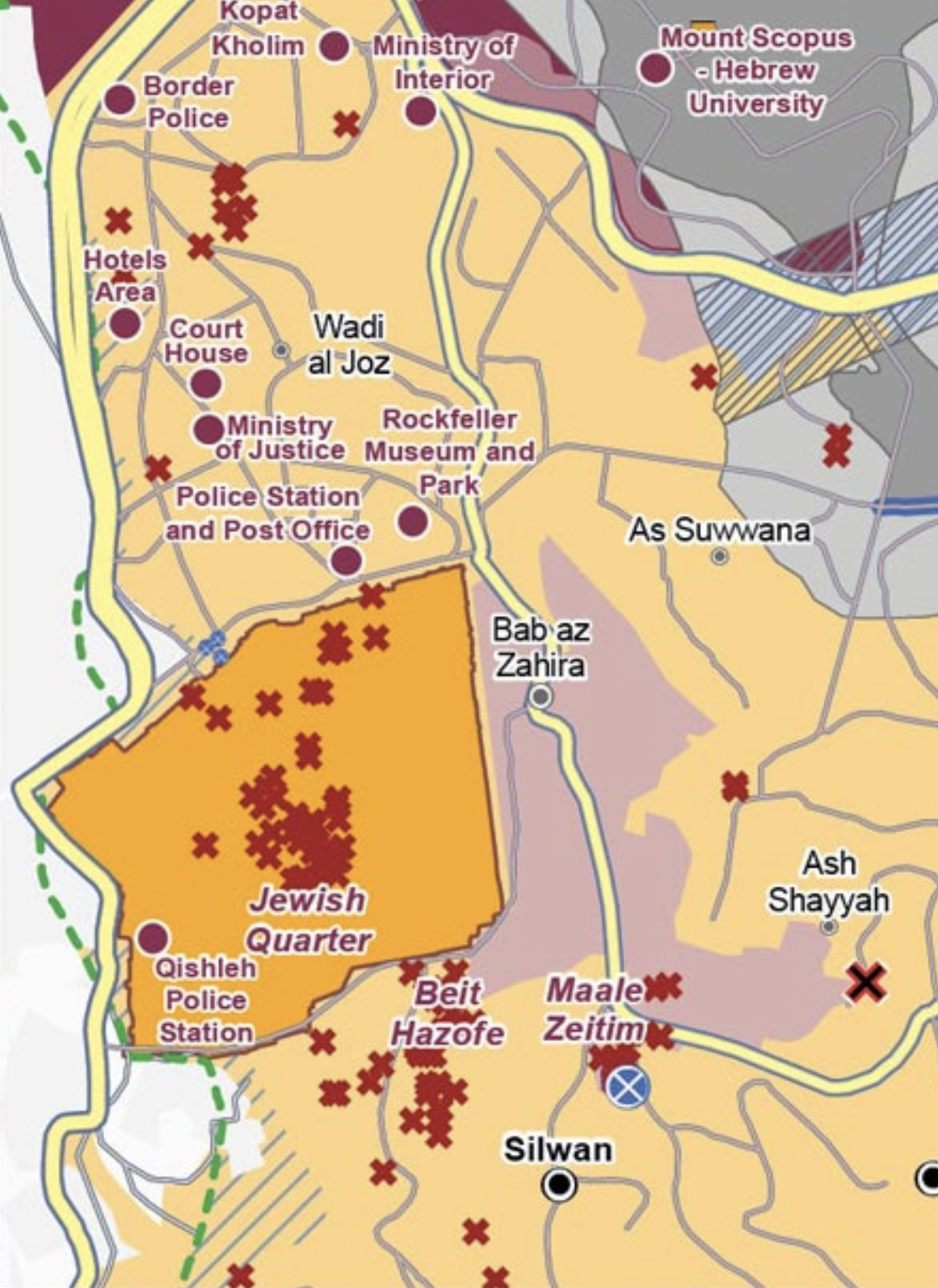
UN (OCHAoPt) map of Israeli "inner settlement" ring (red crosses) around Jerusalem. Silwan is south-east of the Old City, flanked by "Beit Hazofe" (בית הצופה, "Observation House") and Ma'ale HaZeitim.

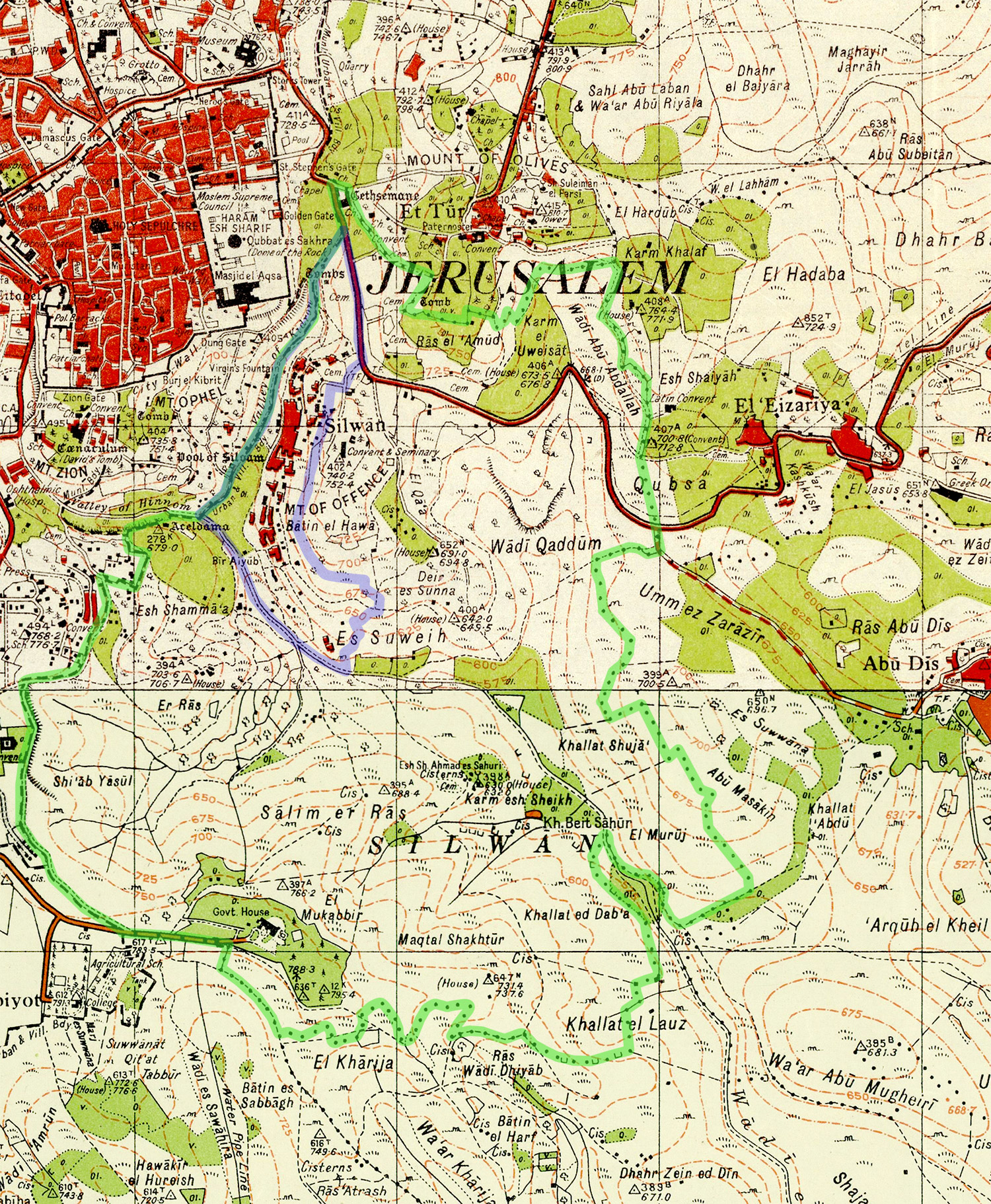
The village boundary of Silwan in 1943–1946 is outlined in green. The boundary of Silwan in 2020 according to the Israeli municipal plan of Jerusalem is outlined in blue (note that this area is in East Jerusalem).

Silwan is located southwest of the Old City Walls and constitutes part of the Jerusalem's "Holy Basin." The neighborhood has a narrow shape on a north-to-south axis. It is bounded by Wadi Hilweh and Abu Tor to the west and the Ras al-Amud neighborhood to east. Its southern tip touches the Jabel Mukaber neighborhood and its northern tip touches the Mount of Olives Jewish Cemetery.

Built on the southern ridge of the Mount of Olives, Silwan slopes steeply from approximately 700–600 metres (2,300–2,000 ft) above sea level, until it reaches the Kidron Valley, which bounds it in the west. The historical core lies is in the northwestern section, considered to be the site of ancient Jerusalem. Dozens of ancient burial tombs attributed to the time of ancient Israel and Judah as well as the Byzantine rule were found there. Arab villagers used the tombs as dwellings or enclosures for livestock. Many of the burial tombs are inhabited until today. The village was built next to numerous water sources of historical importance, such as the Pool of Siloam (Ain Silwan), Gihon Spring and Ein Rogel. The rest of the village was built in the 19th century.

== History ==
=== Iron Age ===
In the ancient period, the area where the village stands was occupied by the necropolis of the Biblical kingdom. In the valley below, according to the Hebrew Bible, "the waters of Shiloah go softly" (from the Gihon Spring; Isaiah 8:6) and "the Pool of Siloam" (Nehemiah 3:15) to water what since King Solomon became known as the king's garden (Jeremiah 39:4; 52:7; 2 Kings 25:4; Nehemiah 3:15).

The necropolis, or ancient cemetery, is an archaeological site of major significance. It contains fifty rock-cut tombs of distinguished calibre, assumed to be the burial places of the highest-ranking officials of the Judean kingdom. Tomb inscriptions are in Hebrew. One of the ancient rock-cut tombs in Silwan is known as the Tomb of Pharaoh's daughter. Another notable tomb, called the Tomb of the Royal Steward is now incorporated into a modern-period house. The ancient inscription states that it was the final resting place of ""...yahu who is over the house." The first part of the Hebrew name is effaced, but refers to a Judean royal steward or chamberlain. The inscription is now in the collection of the British Museum.

At their first thorough archaeological investigation, all of the tombs were long since emptied, and their contents removed. A great deal of destruction was done to the tombs over the centuries by Roman-period quarrying and later by their conversion for use as housing, both by monks in the Byzantine period, when some were used as churches, and later by Muslim villagers " ... when the Arab village was built; tombs were destroyed, incorporated in houses or turned into water cisterns and sewage dumps."

According to the Hebrew Bible, Siloam was built around the "serpent-stone," Zoheleth, where Adonijah gave his feast in the time of Solomon.

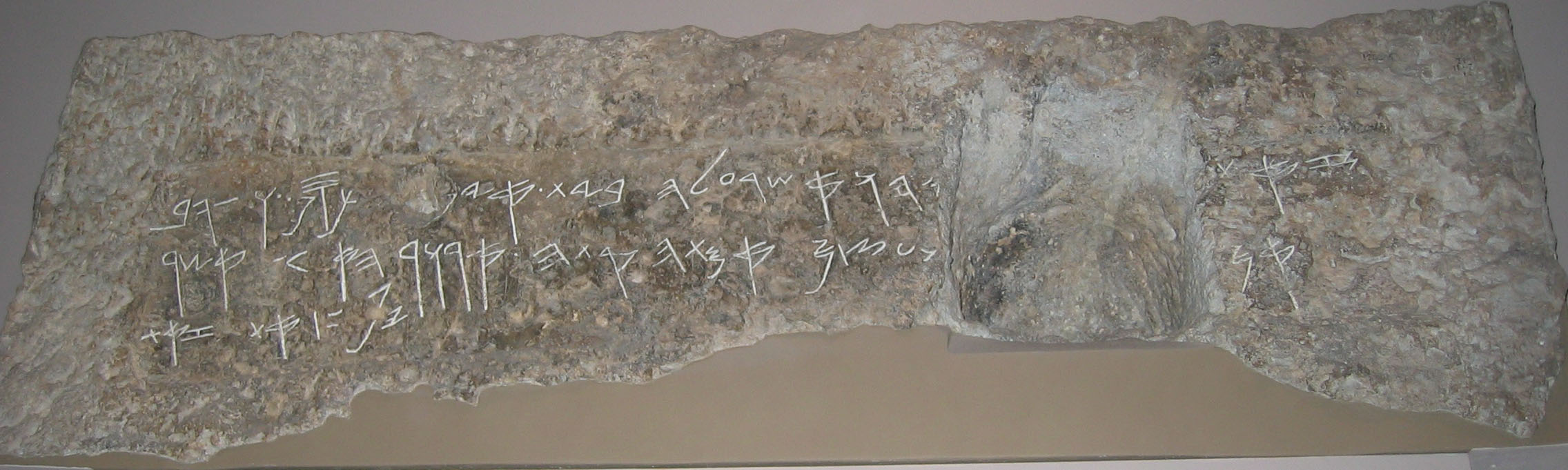
An inscription from Siloam, known as the Royal Steward inscription, from the lintel of Shebna-yahu's tomb

The Siloam inscription was discovered in the water tunnel built during the reign of Hezekiah, in the early 7th century BC. The Siloam inscription is now preserved in the Archeological Museum of Istanbul, Turkey. Another important inscription found at Siloam is the lintel of Shebna-yahu's tomb (known as the Shebna Inscription), which is in the collections of the British Museum. In 2004, archaeologists excavating the site for the Israel Antiquities Authority found biblical-era coins marked with ancient Hebrew writing, pottery shards and a stone bottle cork that confirmed the identification of the site as the biblical Siloam Pool.

=== Roman Empire ===
The King's Garden was used as a staging area for Jewish pilgrims who, during the festivals of Passover, Shavuot and Sukkot, used the spring-fed Pool of Siloam to wash and ritually purify themselves before ascending the monumental stepped street to the Temple Mount while singing hymns based on Psalms. On Sukkot water was brought from the Pool of Siloam to the Temple and poured upon the altar and the priests also drank of this water.

In the New Testament, the collapse of the Tower of Siloam is cited by Jesus as one of two examples where sudden, untimely death came to people who didn't necessarily deserve it more than most other sinful people.

According to the Gospel of John, Jesus healed a man who had been blind from birth. Jesus spat on the ground, made mud with the saliva, and spread the mud over the blind man's eyes. He then told the man, "Go wash yourself in the Pool of Siloam." So the man went and washed and came back seeing.

Josephus described the waters of Siloam as "sweet and abundant." During the general outbreak of hostilities between the Jewish nation and the Roman Imperial army in ca. 66 CE, Simon bar Giora controlled all of the "Upper City" where he made his place of residence in the Phasael tower before abandoning it, and part of the "Lower City" (Acra) as far as the great wall in the Kidron Valley and the fountain of Siloam, now in Silwan.

=== Byzantine Empire ===
A pool and church were built at Siloam by the Byzantine empress Eudocia (c. 400–460 CE) to commemorate Jesus' miraculous healing of the blind.

=== Caliphates and Crusaders ===
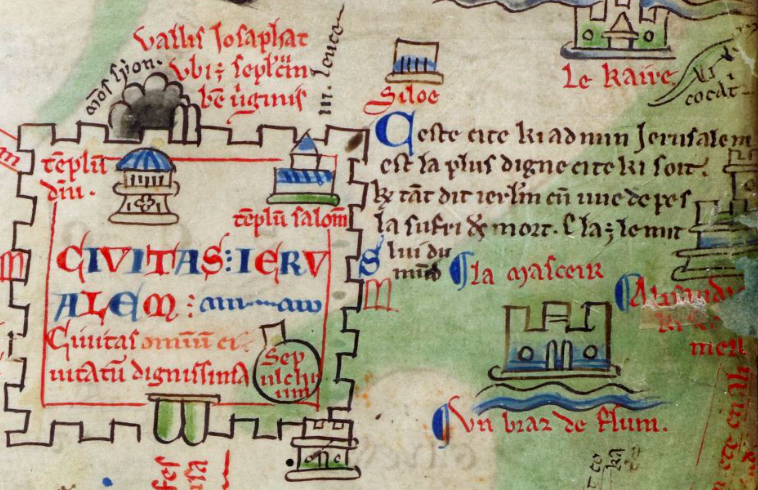
Silwan shown in a 1250CE manuscript of Matthew Paris's pilgrimage map from Chronica Majora

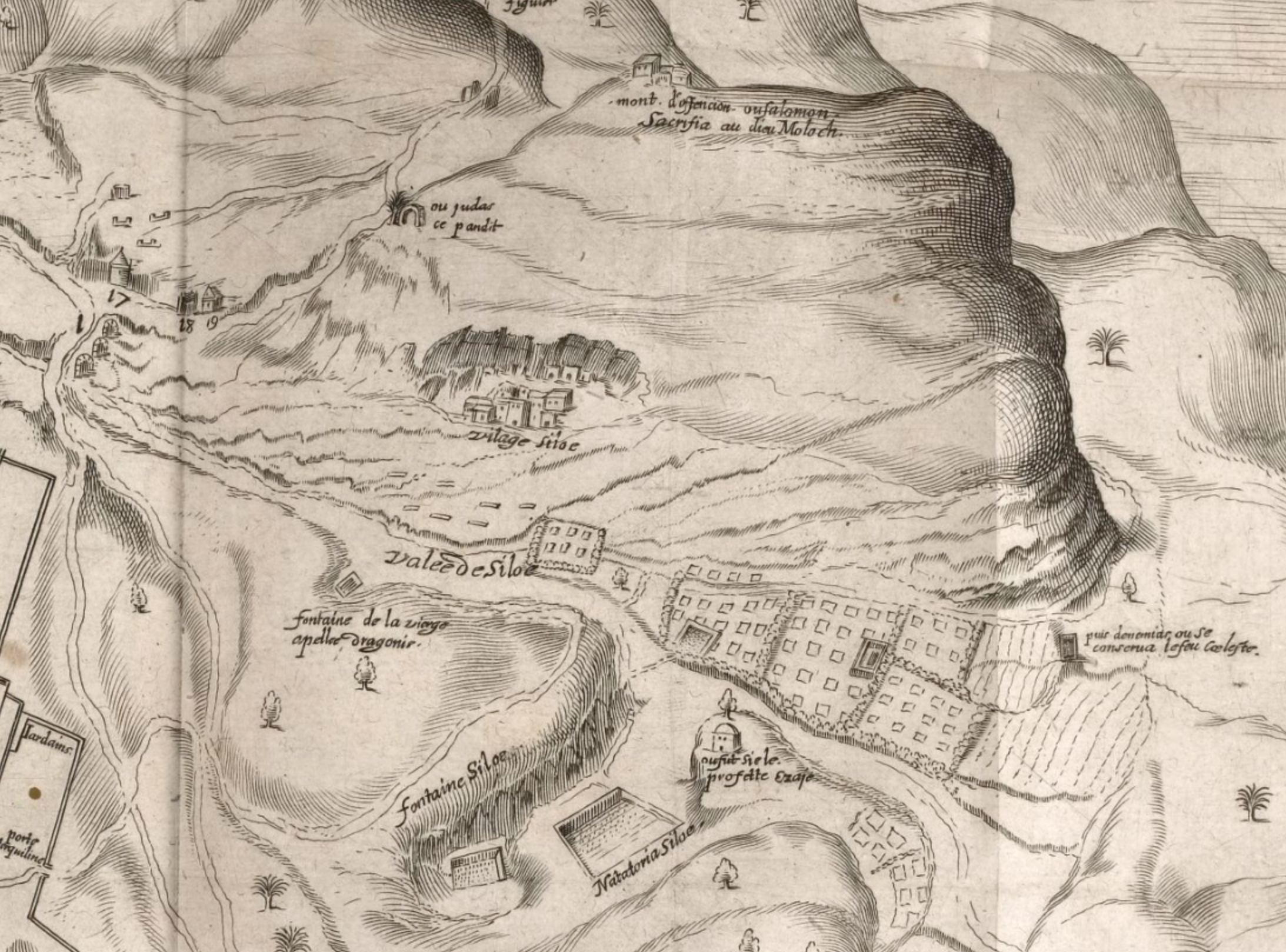
Silwan ("village de Siloe") in Louis Deshayes' Voyage du Levant, fait par le commandement du roi en 1621

Local folklore dates Silwan to the arrival of the second Rashidun caliph, Umar ibn al-Khattab from Arabia. According to one resident's version of the story, the Greeks were so impressed that the Caliph entered on foot while his servant rode on a camel that they presented him with the key to the city. The Caliph thereafter granted the wadi to "Khan Silowna," an agricultural community of cave dwellers living in ancient rock-cut tombs along the face of the eastern ridge.

In medieval Islamic tradition, the spring of Silwan (Ayn Silwan) was among the four most sacred water sources in the world. The others were Zamzam in Mecca, Ayn Falus in Beisan and Ayn al-Baqar in Acre. Silwan is mentioned as "Sulwan" by the 10th-century Arab writer and traveller al-Muqaddasi. In his 985 book he noted that (as rendered in the edition by Le Strange) "The village of Sulwan is a place on the outskirts of the city [Jerusalem]. Below the village of 'Ain Sulwan (Spring of Siloam), of fairly good water, which irrigates the large gardens which were given in bequest (Waqf) by the Khalif 'Othman ibn 'Affan for the poor of the city. Lower down than this, again, is Job's Well (Bir Ayyub). It is said that on the Night of 'Arafat the water of the holy well Zamzam, at Makkah, comes underground to the water of the Spring (of Siloam). The people hold a festival here on that evening."

Moshe Gil interprets statements by Muqaddasi (writing in 985), Nasir-i Khusraw (1047), and Yaqut (1225), as meaning that what they called the Spring of Silwan, must be a water source located at quite a distance farther south, Khusraw actually indicated a distance of around 3 kilometers from Jerusalem's walls. This leads to Gil identifying the medieval "Spring of Silwan" with what is known today as the Spring of Bir Ayyub (the biblical Ein Rogel spring), whose exact location is unknown, but was several kilometers from the city walls.

=== Ottoman Empire ===
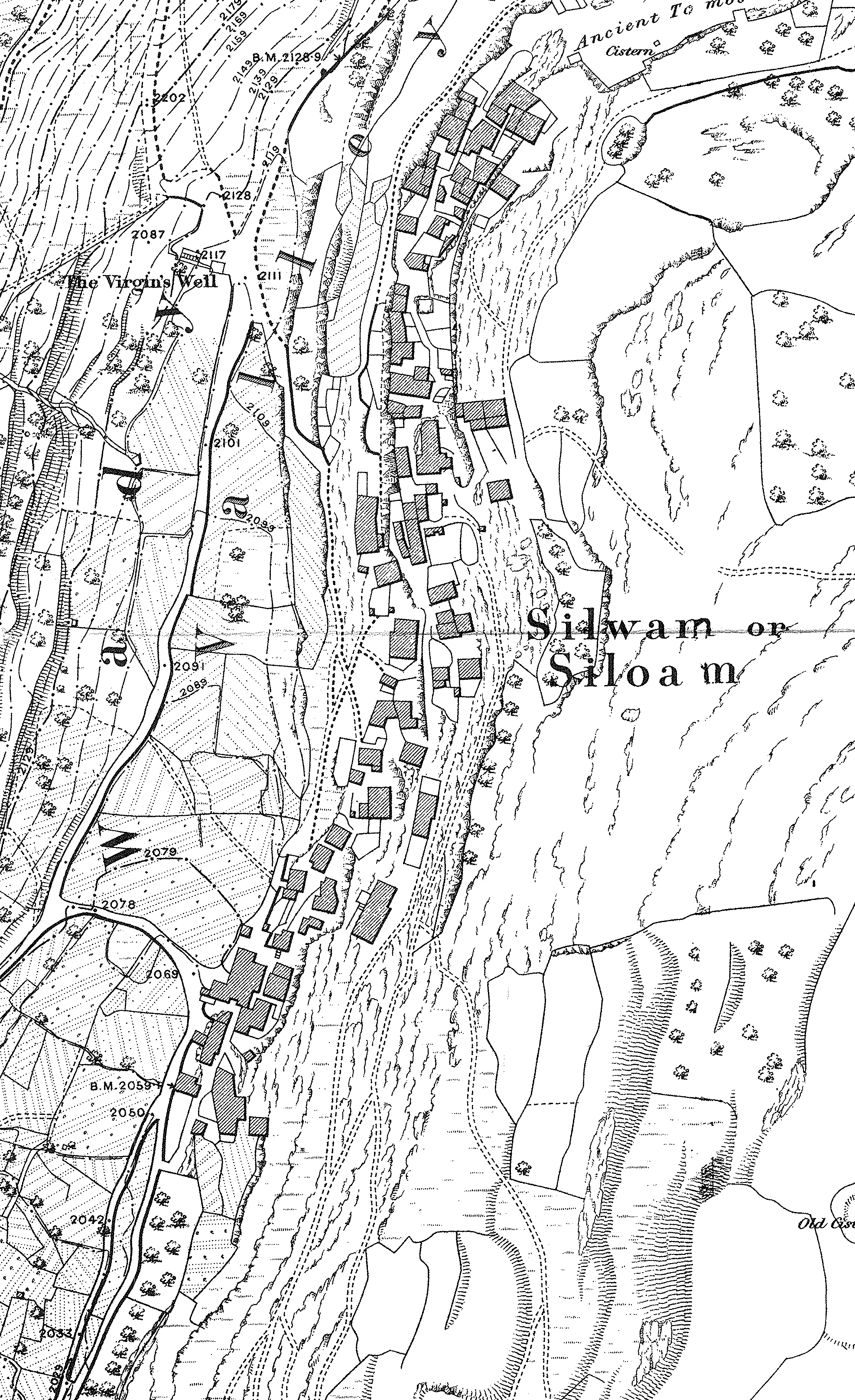
Silwan in the 1865 Ordnance Survey of Jerusalem

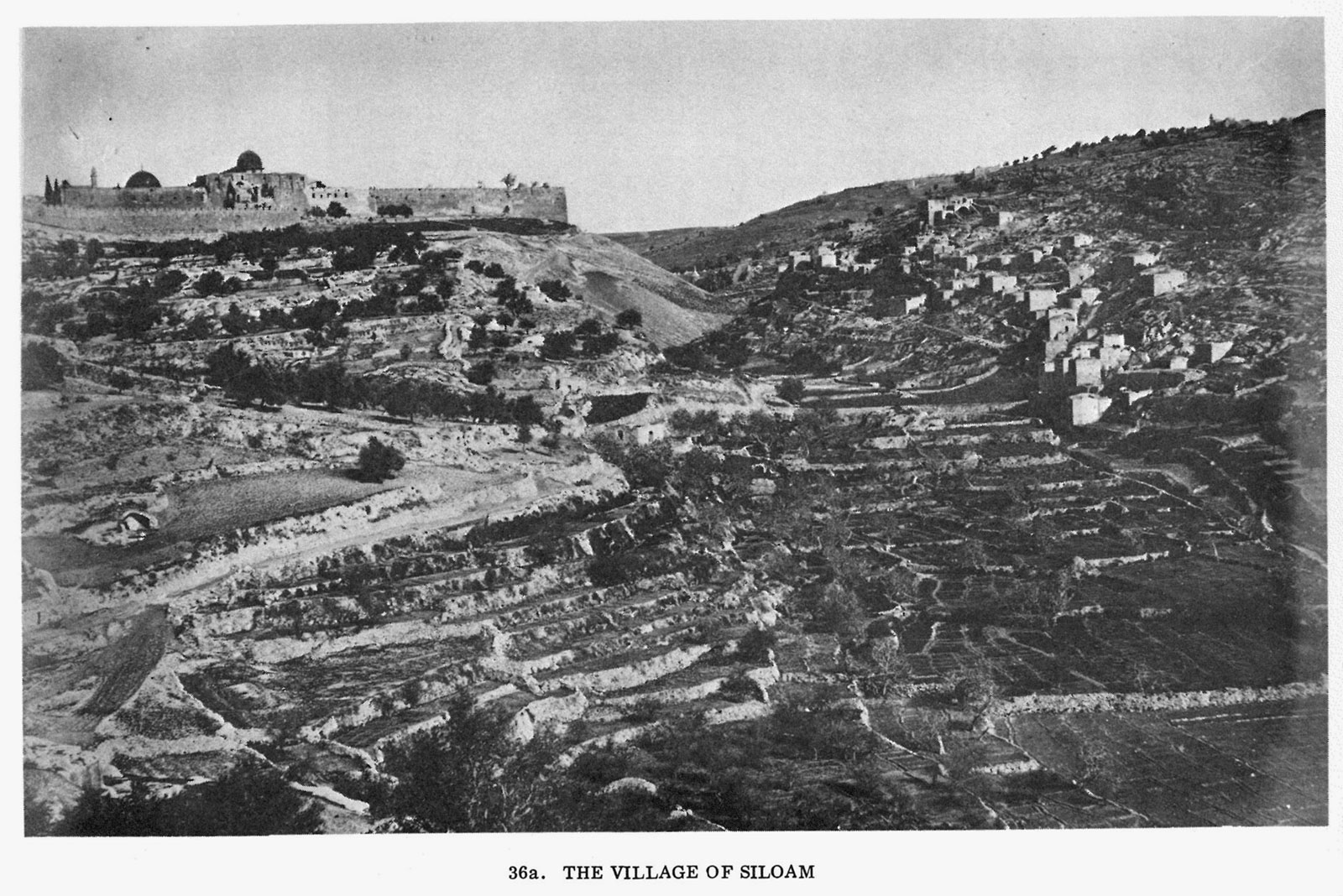
View of Silwan from the south, ca. 1864

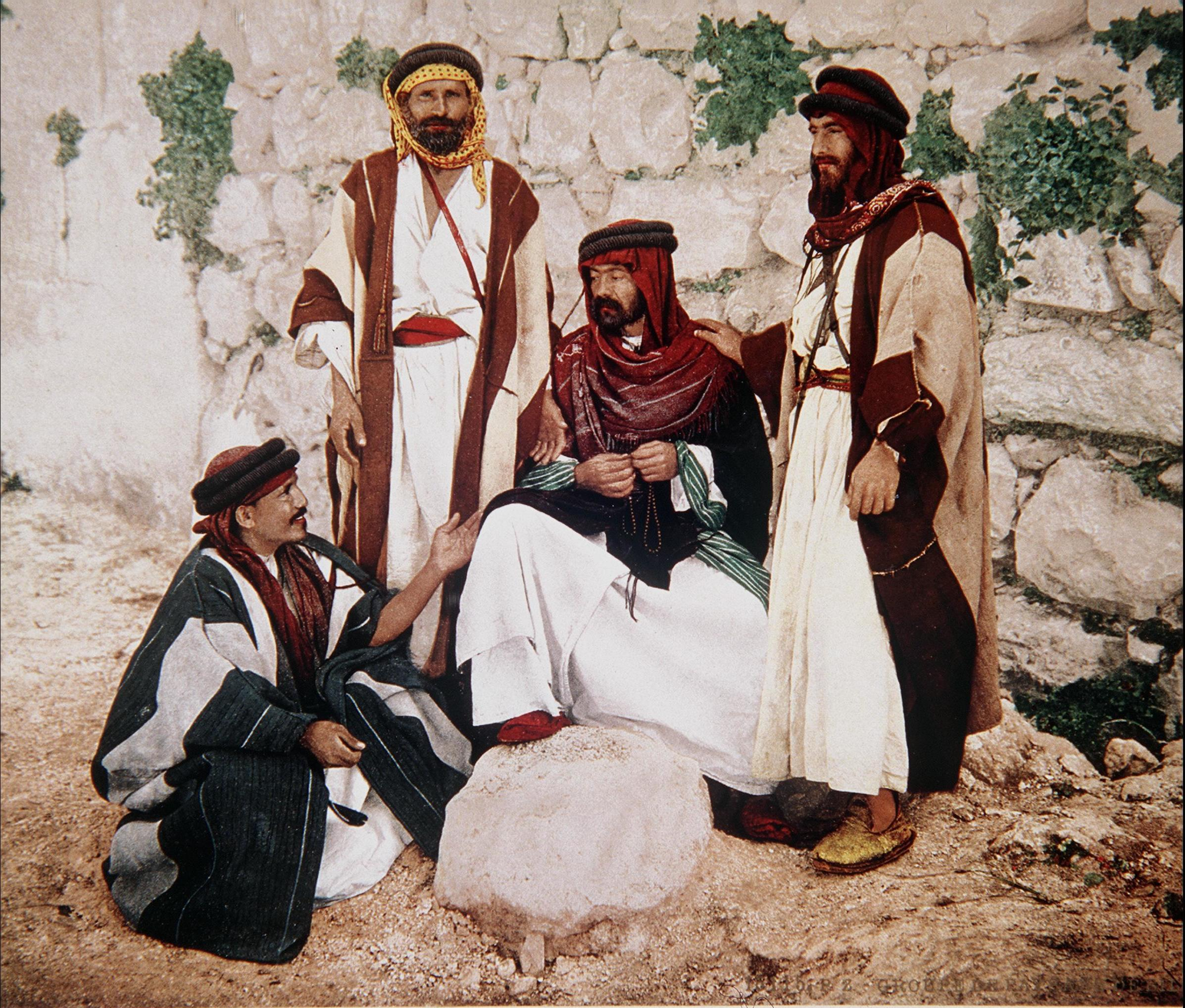
Men from Silwan, by Maison Bonfils, ca. 1890

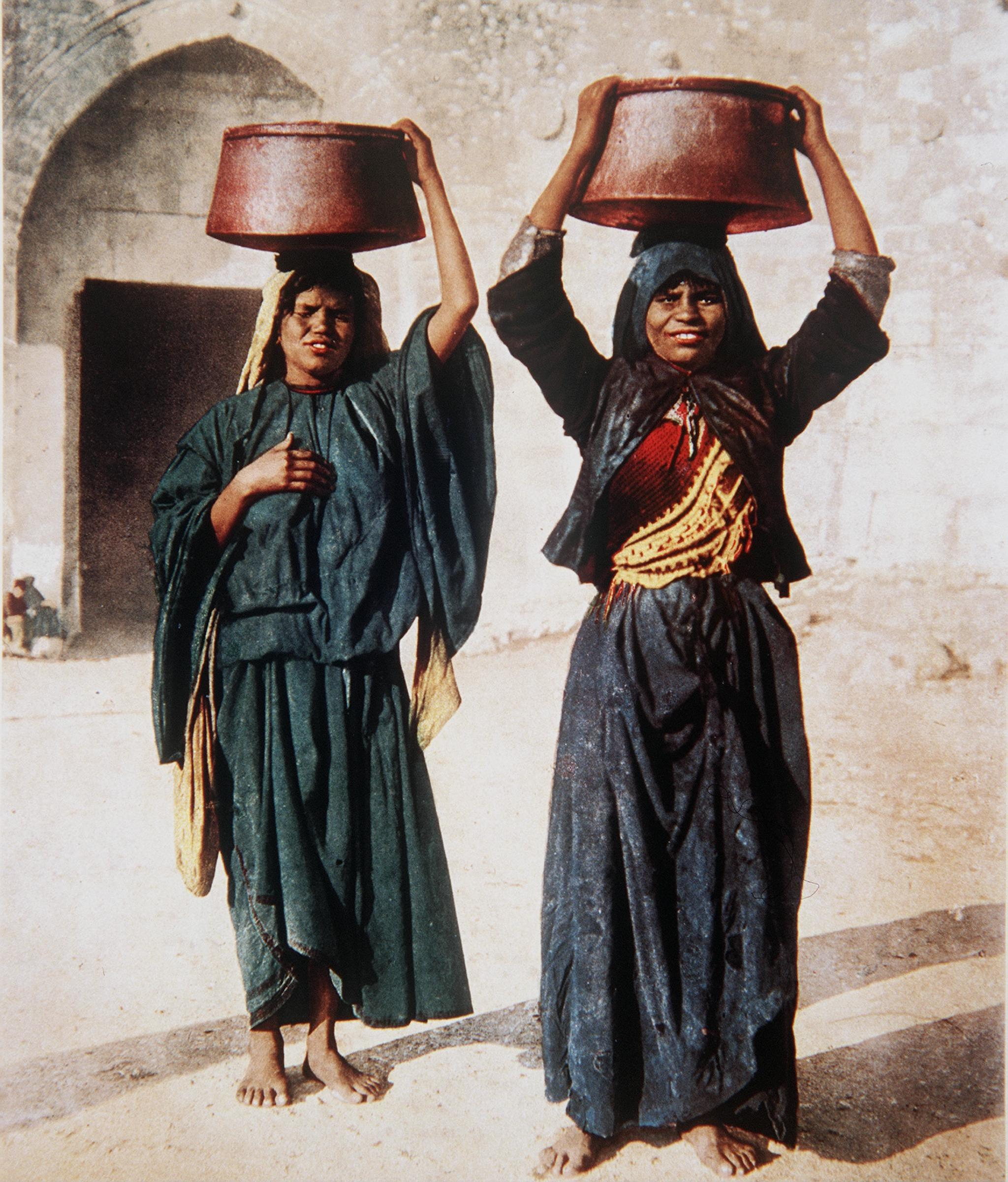
Women from Silwan, carrying containers filled with labneh, by Bonfils, ca. 1890

In 1596, Ayn Silwan appeared in Ottoman tax registers as being in the Nahiya of Quds of the Liwa of Quds, with a population of 60 households, all Muslim. They paid a total of 35,500 akçe in taxes, and all of the revenues went to a Waqf.

In 1834, during a large-scale peasants' rebellion against Ibrahim Pasha, thousands of rebels infiltrated Jerusalem through ancient underground sewage channels leading to the farm fields of the village of Silwan. A traveller to Palestine in 1883, T. Skinner, wrote that the olive groves near Silwan were a gathering place for Muslims on Fridays.

In 1838 Silwan was noted as a Muslim village, part of el-Wadiyeh district, located east of Jerusalem.

A photograph of the village taken between 1853 and 1857 by James Graham can be found on page 35 of Picturing Jerusalem by photographers James Graham and Mendel Diness. It shows the western part of the modern village as empty of habitations, a few trees are scattered across the southern ridge with the small village confined to the ridgetop east of the valley.

In the mid-1850s, the villagers of Silwan were paid £100 annually by the Jews in an effort to prevent the desecration of graves on the Mount of Olives. Nineteenth-century travellers described the village as a robbers' lair. Charles Wilson wrote that "the houses and the streets of Siloam, if such they may be called, are filthy in the extreme." Charles Warren depicted the population as a lawless set, credited with being "the most unscrupulous ruffians in Palestine."

An official Ottoman village list from about 1870 showed that Silwan had a total of 92 houses and a population of 240, though the population count included only men.

In 1883, the Palestine Exploration Fund's Survey of Western Palestine (SWP) described Silwan as a "village perched on a precipice and badly built of stone. The waters is brought from Ain Umm ed Deraj. There are numerous caves among and behind the houses, which are used as stables by the inhabitants."

Modern settlement of the western ridge of the modern urban neighborhood of Silwan began in 1873–1874, when the Meyuchas family moved out of the Old City to a new home on the ridge. It was called Wadi Hilweh in Arabic.

In books published between 1888 and 1911, travellers describe the valley floor as verdant and cultivated, with the stony village perched along the top of the eastern ridge hillside. Explorer Gustaf Dalman (1855–1941) describes the manner in which the villagers of Silwan irrigated their vegetable crop which they planted on terraces. The village of Silwan was located on the eastern slope of the Kidron Valley, above the outlet of the Gihon Spring opposite Wadi Hilweh. The villagers cultivated the arable land in the Kidron Valley, which in biblical tradition formed the king's gardens during the Davidic dynasty, to grow vegetables for market in Jerusalem.

Between 1885 and 1891, 45 new stone houses were built for a Yemenite Jewish community in what is now the Batn al-Hawa area of Silwan. The neighbourhood included a place of worship now known as the Old Yemenite Synagogue.

In 1896 the population of Silwan was estimated to be about 939 persons.

In 1911, amateur archaeologist Montagu Parker claimed the then Mount Ophel area was the location of the "ancient City of David." In 1913, Jewish-French professional archaeologist Raymond Weill (1874–1950) investigated the site and agreed it was "the City of David."

=== British Mandate ===
At the time of the 1922 census of Palestine, "Selwan (Kfar Hashiloah)" had a population of 1,901 persons; 1,699 Muslims, 153 Jews and 49 Christians, where the Christians were 16 Roman Catholics and 33 Syrian Catholics. In the same year, Baron Edmond de Rothschild bought several acres of land there and transferred it to the Palestine Jewish Colonization Association. By the time of the 1931 census, Silwan had 630 occupied houses and a population of 2968; 2,553 Muslims, 124 Jews and 91 Christians (the last including the Latin, Greek and St. Stephens convents).

In the 1936–39 Arab revolt in Palestine, the Yemenite community was removed from Silwan by the Welfare Bureau of the Va'ad Leumi into the Jewish Quarter as security conditions for Jews worsened, and in 1938, the remaining Yemenite Jews in Silwan were evacuated by the Jewish Community Council on the advice of the police. According to documents in the custodian office and real estate and project advancement expert Edmund Levy, the homes of the Yemenite Jews were occupied by Arab families without registering ownership.

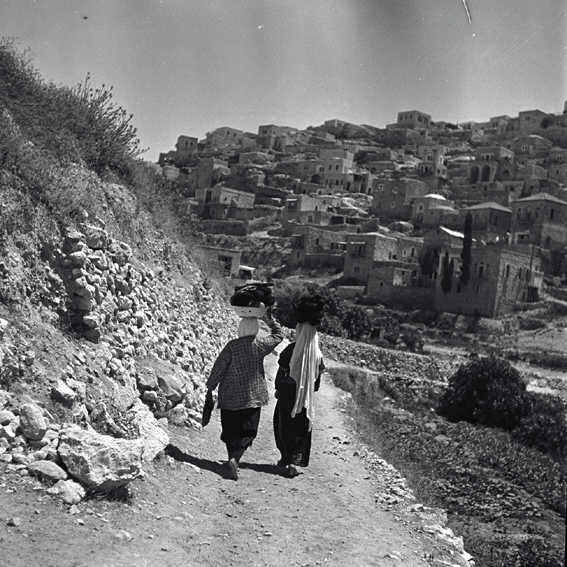
Silwan 1945

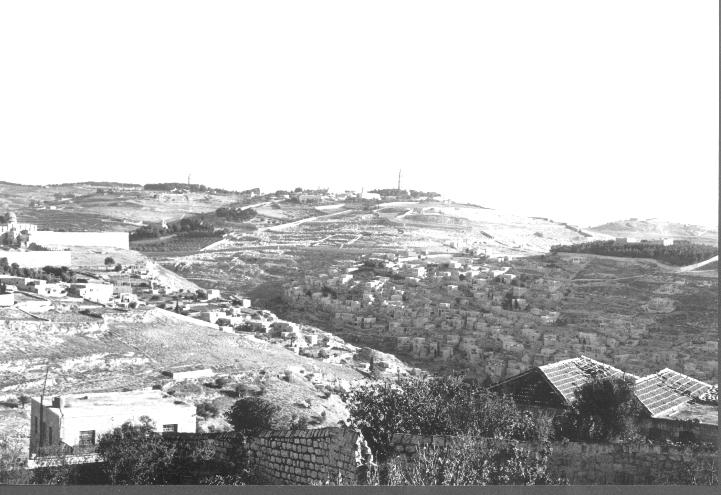
Silwan 1948

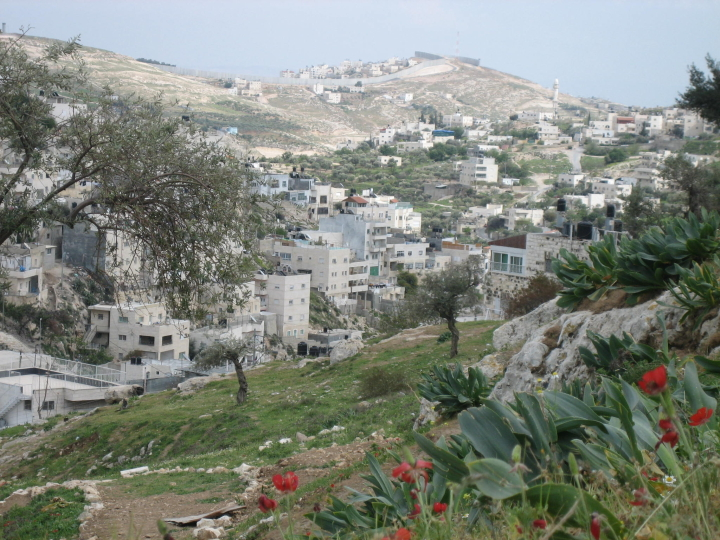
Silwan from Abu Tor, in 2005, looking towards the Israeli West Bank barrier near the Old City

In the twentieth century, Silwan grew northward towards Jerusalem, expanding from a small farming village into an urban neighborhood. Modern Arab Silwan encompasses Old Silwan (generally to the south), the Yemenite village (to the north), and the once-vacant land between. Today Silwan follows the ridge of the southern peak of the Mount of Olives to the east of the Kidron Valley, from the ridge west of the Ophel up to the southern wall of the Temple Mount/Haram al-Sharif.

In the 1945 statistics the population of Silwan was 3,820; 3,680 Muslims and 140 Christians, with a total of 5,421 dunams of land according to an official land and population survey. Of this, Arabs used 58 dunams for plantations and irrigable land and 2,498 for cereals, while Jews used 51 for cereals. A total of 172 dunams were classified as built-up (urban) land.

The United Nations 1947 partition plan for Palestine included Silwan together with Jerusalem and Bethlehem in an international Corpus Separatum. Benny Morris wrote that the Israel's supporters rejoiced at the passage of the plan, while the Arab delegations walked out. However, both countries refused the full plan, but were initially willing to consider a smaller level of internationalization. After the 1948–1949 war, the area was divided between Israel and Jordan along the 1949 armistice line. More limited offers of internationalization were discussed informally, but agreement was never reached.

=== Jordan ===
After the 1948 Arab–Israeli War, Silwan came under Jordanian administration along with the rest of the West Bank, and land there owned by Jews was managed by the Jordanian Custodian of Enemy Property. Jordan annexed the area in stages after capturing it. Most countries did not accept annexation by Jordan. Silwan was annexed to the Jordanian municipality of Jerusalem in 1961. It remained under Jordanian rule until 1967, when Israel captured the Old City and surrounding region. Until then, the village had delegates in the Jerusalem City Council.

=== Israel ===
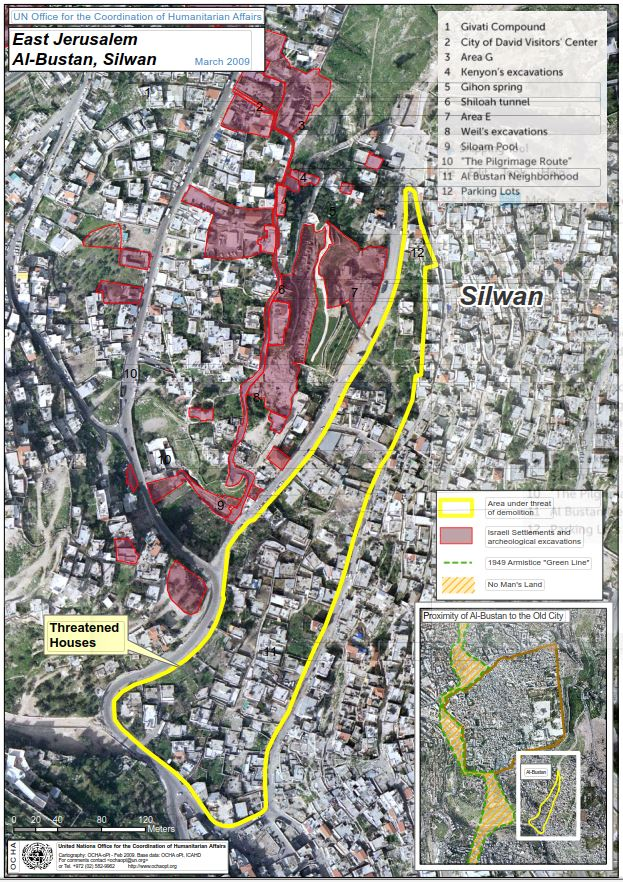
Locations of archaeological digs in SIlwan

Since the 1967 Six-Day War Silwan has been under Israeli occupation, and Jewish organizations have sought to re-establish a Jewish presence there. The Ir David Foundation and the Ateret Cohanim organizations are promoting resettlement of Jews in the neighborhood in cooperation with the Committee for the Renewal of the Yemenite Village in Shiloah.

In 1987, the Permanent Representative of Jordan to the United Nations wrote to the Secretary-General to inform him of Israeli settlement activity; his letter noted that an Israeli company had taken over two Palestinian houses in the neighborhood of al-Bustan, after evicting their occupants, claiming the houses were its property. Wadi Hilweh, an area of Silwan close to the southern wall of the Old City, and its neighborhood of al-Bustan, has been ever since a focus of Jewish settlement.

==== Jewish settlements ====
Silwan in the OCHAoPT map of evictions in East Jerusalem as at 2016

In 1991, a movement was formed to promote Jewish settlement in Silwan. Some Silwan properties had already been declared absentee property in the 1980s, and suspicions arose that a number of claims filed by Jewish organizations had been accepted by the Custodian without any site visits or follow-up. Property in Silwan has been purchased by Jews through indirect sales, some by invoking the Absentee Property Law. In other cases, the Jewish National Fund signed protected tenant agreements that enabled construction to proceed without a tender process.

As of 2004, more than 50 Jewish families live in the area, some in homes acquired from Arabs who claim they did not know they were selling their homes to Jews, some in Beit Yonatan.

In 2003, Ateret Cohanim built a seven-storey apartment building known as Beit Yonatan (named for Jonathan Pollard) without a permit. In 2007, the courts ordered the eviction of the residents, but the building was approved retroactively. In 2008 a plan was submitted for a building complex including a synagogue, 10 apartments, a kindergarten, a library and underground parking for 100 cars in a location 200 meters from the Old City walls. Rabbis for Human Rights-North America, which changed its name to T'ruah in 2012, accused Elad of creating a "method of expelling citizens from their properties, appropriating public areas, enclosing these lands with fences and guards, and banning the entrance of the local residents...under the protection of a private security force." Approximately 1,500 supporters of RHR-NA/T'ruah wrote to Russell Robinson, CEO of JNF-US, to demand an end to the eviction of a Silwan family. Overnight on September 30, 2014, at 1:30 am, settlers, supported by police officers and reportedly connected to the Ir David Foundation, commonly known as Elad, entered 25 houses in 7 buildings which previously belonged to several Palestinian families in the neighborhood, in what was the largest Israeli purchase of homes in Silwan since 1986. Most were vacant, but in one house where a family was evicted a confrontation broke out. Details concerning the process whereby the properties were purchased are lacking, but Palestinian middle men appear to be involved, buying the six houses, and then selling them to a private American company, Kendall Finance. Elad stated that the houses had been bought properly and legally. Advertisements were posted on Facebook offering Jewish ex-army veterans $140 a day to sit in the properties until families move in. As those who sell land to Israelis may be sentenced to death by the PA, the son of one Palestinian family who sold his property has fled Jerusalem, in fear for his life. Some of the Palestinian families claiming ownership intended to get the settlers out by taking legal steps.

In response to this move, on October 2, 2014, the European Union condemned settlement expansion in Silwan. White House spokesman Josh Earnest, in a condemnation of the takeover, described the new occupants as "individuals who are associated with an organization whose agenda, by definition, stokes tensions between Israelis and Palestinians." Israeli prime minister Benjamin Netanyahu was "baffled" by US criticism, deeming it "un-American" to criticize the legal purchase of homes in East Jerusalem to either Jews or Arabs.

On June 15, 2016, Jerusalem's City Hall approved the construction of a three-storey residential house for Jews wishing to make Silwan their home.

A ruling handed down by the Jerusalem Magistrats Court in January 2020 gave a substantial boost to efforts by the settler organization Ateret Cohanim to evict large numbers of Palestinians in Silwan from their homes. The organization managed to take over control of an Ottoman era (19th century) Jewish trust, called the Benvenisti Trust after Rabbi Moshe Benvenisti, and claims that land in areas of Silwan, such as the Batan al-Hawa neighborhood, was 'sacred religious land' and that Palestinians residing on this trust land were illegal squatters. The decisions are thought to effectively threaten with displacement some 700 Palestinians in Silwan.

==== The Sumreen (or Sumarin) family ====
The house where the family lives is in the middle of an area designated by Israel as "the City of David National Park." where a right-wing, pro-settler organization, Elad, runs an archaeological and biblical theme park known as City of David.

In December 2011, a board member of the Jewish National Fund's US fundraising arm resigned in protest after a 20-year legal process came to a head with an order for the eviction of a Palestinian family from a JNF-owned home. The home had been acquired via the Absentee Property Law. Several days before the order was carried out, JNF announced it would be delayed. In 2011 the verdict was overturned. In 2017, the claim was successfully renewed. In September 2019, the Sumreen family lost an appeal and appealed to the District Court. In June 2020, the appeal was rejected. After criticism from many directions the JNF has asked for a rehearing of the proceedings. In August, the eviction process was suspended. JNF and Elad are in disagreement over the process.

On 9 January 2022, following receipt of an opinion stating "there is no objection to the expulsion" from Israeli Attorney General Avichai Mandelblit, a decision by the Supreme Court is awaited.

On 3 April 2023, the Supreme Court ruled against eviction and that the JNF's subsidiary Heimanuta must pay compensation of 20,000 shekels ($5,560).

==== Housing demolition and construction permits ====
In 2005, the Israeli government planned to demolish 88 Arab homes in al-Bustan neighborhood built without permits but they were not found illegal in a municipal court.

According to the State Comptroller's report, there were 130 illegal structures in Silwan in 2009, a tenfold increase since 1967. When enforcement of the building code began in al-Bustan in 1995, thirty illegal structures were found, mostly old residential buildings. By 2004, the number of illegal structures rose to 80. The municipality launched legal proceedings against 43 and demolished 10, but these were soon replaced by new buildings.

The group Ir Amim argues that the illegal construction is due to insufficient granting of permits by the Jerusalem municipality. They say that under Israeli administration, fewer than 20 permits, mainly minor, were issued for this part of Silwan, and that as a result, most building in this part of Silwan and the whole neighborhood generally lack permits. They also say that as of 2009, the vast majority of buildings in the neighborhood were built without permits, in particular in al-Bustan. In 2010, Ir Amim's petition to halt a municipal zoning plan for the City of David area was rejected. The plan does not call for demolition of illegal construction, but rather regulates where construction may continue. The group said that the plan favored the interests of Elad and the neighborhood's Jewish residents, while Elad said that the plan allotted only 15 percent of construction to Jews versus 85 percent to Arab residents. The mukhtar of Silwan objected to Ir Amim's petition against the plan. "We have said that there are good aspects of the plan and there are bad aspects of the plan, we're still working it all out. But to come and say that the whole plan is bad, and to ask that it be done away with, then what have you accomplished? Nothing."

==== Torching of olive trees ====
In May 2010, a group of Israeli settlers torched "an 11-Dunam olive orchard in al-Rababa valley, in Silwan, south of the Old City of Jerusalem" which included the destruction of three olive trees that were over 300 years old. In a 2011 New York Times article, these attacks were called "price tag" attacks.

== Demography ==
The Statistical Yearbook of Jerusalem by the Jerusalem Institute for Israel Studies put the number of residents to 19,050 in 2012. However, the Palestinian neighborhoods in Jerusalem are difficult to define, in contrast to the Jewish neighborhoods, because dense construction has blurred older boundaries and Silwan is now merged with Ras al-Amud, Jabel Mukaber and Abu Tor. The Palestinian residents in Silwan number 20,000 to 50,000 while there are fewer than 700 Jews.

== Education and culture ==
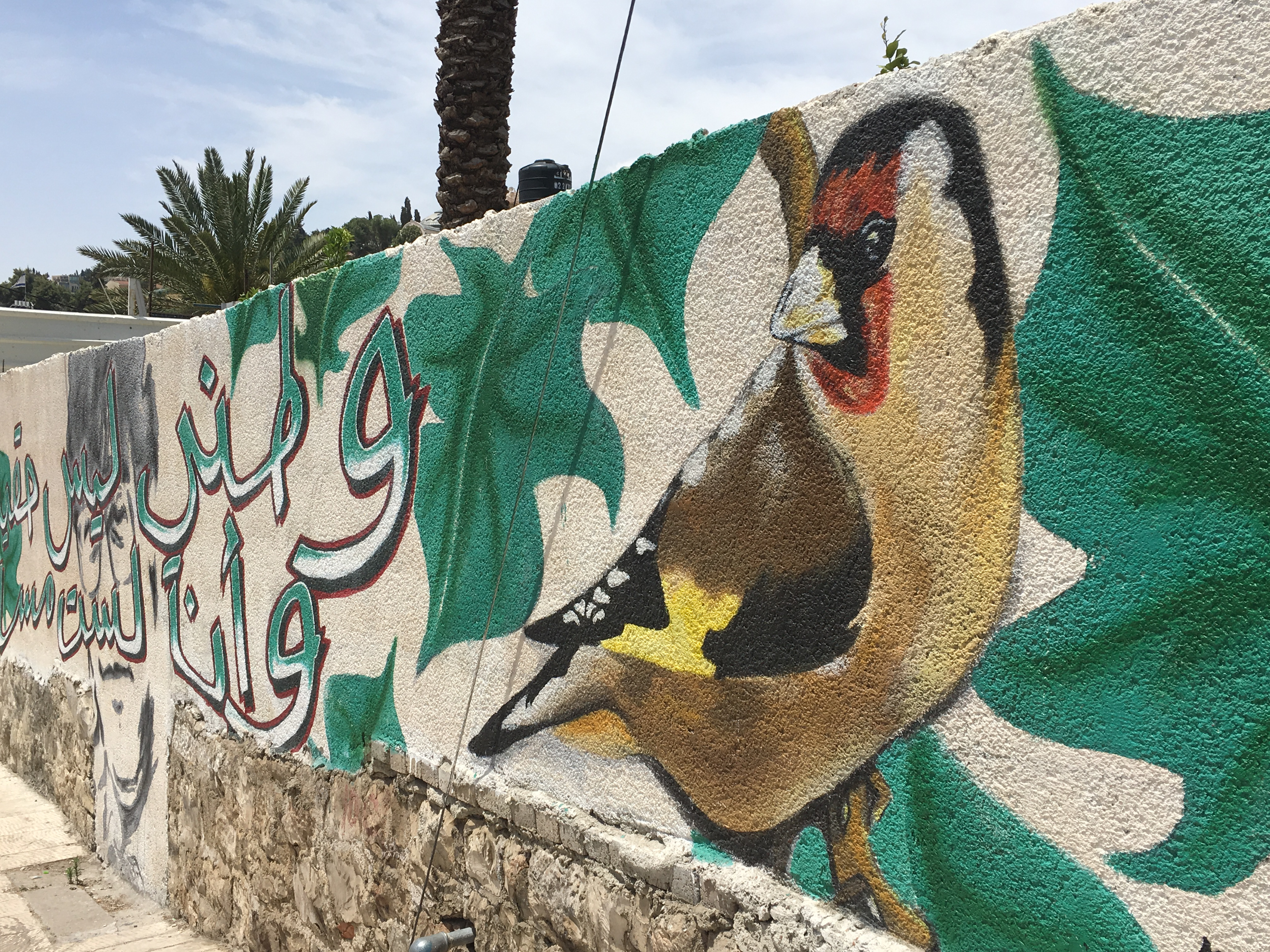
Part of the I Witness Silwan art installation in Silwan

The Silwan Ta'azef Music School opened in October 2007. Since November 2007, an art program, language courses for women, men and children, leadership training for teenage girls, cooking classes, an embroidery club and swimming classes have opened in Silwan. In 2009, a local library was established. Named "Silwan Reads" it opened a branch called the Edward Said Library in Wadi Hilweh in 2020. The Silwan theater group is led by a professional actress from Bethlehem. Many of these activities take place at the Madaa Silwan Creative Center.

== Archaeology ==
=== Silwan necropolis ===
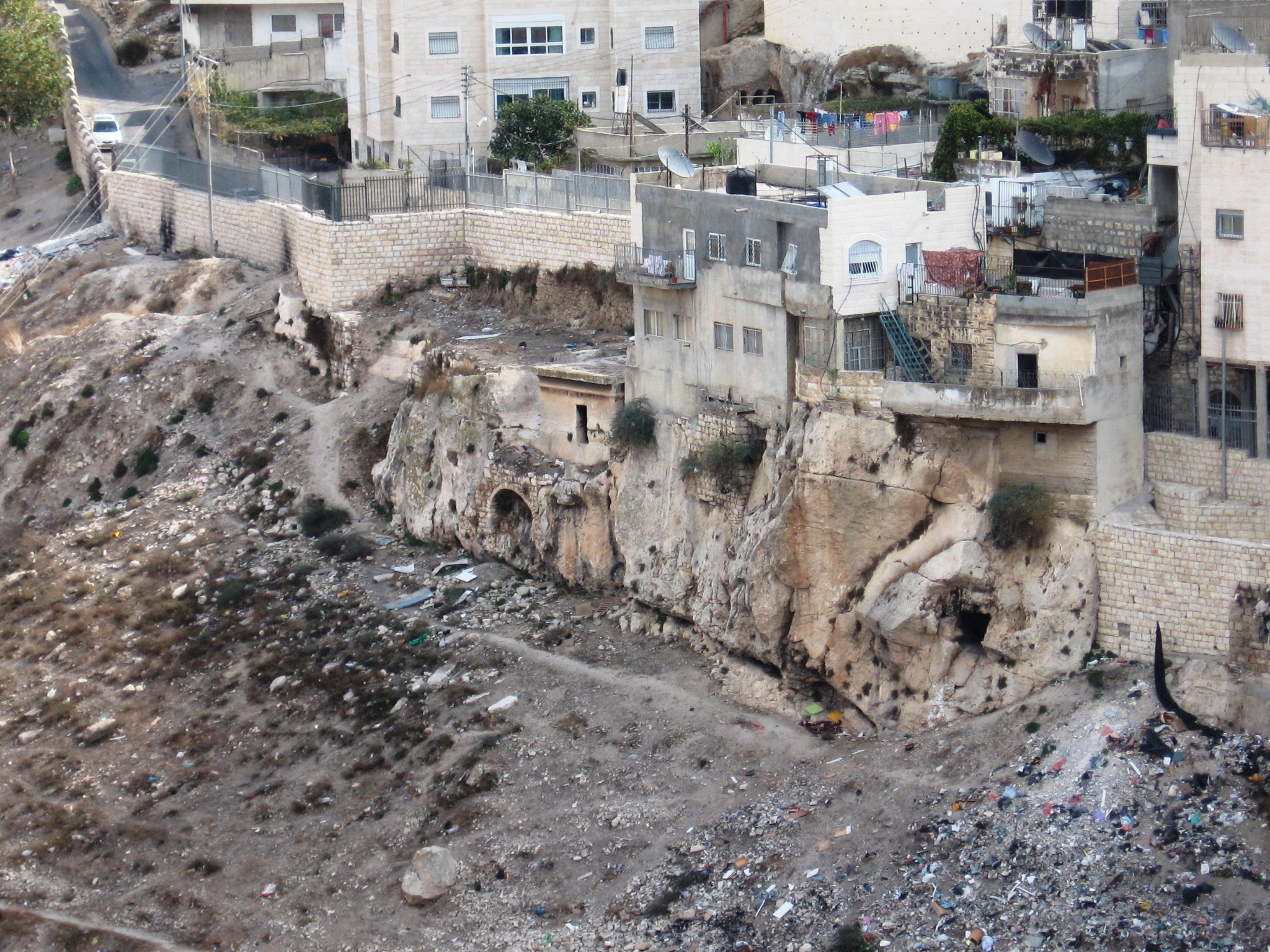
Housing in Silwan built over ancient rock-cut structures

A part of Silwan was built around and above the Silwan necropolis, a series of rock-cut structures originally used as Iron Age tombs, but repurposed for various uses over the millennia.

=== Wadi Hilweh ===
The ridge to the west of Silwan was referred to as Mount Ophel in the Ottoman period, but was mostly vacant. Archaeological exploration began in the 19th century. Jewish and Arab settlement began in the late 19th century. In 1911, what is believed to be the original Bronze Age and Iron Age site of Jerusalem was found and the area began to be called the City of David by archaeologists and tourists. The new neighborhood became known by the Arabic name Wadi Hilweh.

In 2007, archaeologists unearthed under a parking lot a 2,000-year-old mansion that may have belonged to Queen Helene of Adiabene. The building includes storerooms, living quarters and ritual baths. The general area was thought by many historical geographers to be that of Josephus' Acra, so-named after an old fortress that was once there, an area also called the "Lower City."

The archeological discoveries led to major international interest in the area, which received over 600,000 tourists in 2019, but it also led to major controversy and conflict around both archeology and ideology. The Ir David Foundation (or Elad) that received the contract to manage the site is associated with both the National-Religious and Jewish settlers movements.

In 2008, the Ir David organization and the Israel Antiquities Authority were accused of excavating on Palestinian property without permission and beginning work on the City of David tunnels before receiving a permit from the Jerusalem Municipality. In 2008, Islamic-era skeletons discovered in the course of excavations disappeared.

== Bibliography ==
- Barron, J.B., ed. (1923). Palestine: Report and General Abstracts of the Census of 1922. Government of Palestine.
- Conder, C.R.; Kitchener, H.H. (1883). The Survey of Western Palestine: Memoirs of the Topography, Orography, Hydrography, and Archaeology. Vol. 3. London: Committee of the Palestine Exploration Fund.
- Decoster, Koen (1989). "Flavius Josephus and the Seleucid Acra in Jerusalem". Zeitschrift des Deutschen Palästina-Vereins. 105. Wiesbaden, Germany: Deutscher verein zur Erforschung Palästinas (German Society for the Exploration of Palestine) / O. Harrassowitz: 70–84. ISSN 0012-1169. JSTOR 27931357.
- Department of Statistics (1945). Village Statistics, April, 1945. Government of Palestine.
- Hadawi, S. (1970). Village Statistics of 1945: A Classification of Land and Area ownership in Palestine. Palestine Liberation Organization Research Centre. Archived from the original on December 8, 2018.
- Hartmann, M. (1883). "Die Ortschaftenliste des Liwa Jerusalem in dem türkischen Staatskalender für Syrien auf das Jahr 1288 der Flucht (1871)". Zeitschrift des Deutschen Palästina-Vereins. 6: 102–149.
- Hütteroth, W.-D.; Abdulfattah, K. (1977). Historical Geography of Palestine, Transjordan and Southern Syria in the Late 16th Century. Erlanger Geographische Arbeiten, Sonderband 5. Erlangen, Germany: Vorstand der Fränkischen Geographischen Gesellschaft. ISBN 3-920405-41-2.
- Josephus (1981). Josephus Complete Works. Translated by William Whiston. Grand Rapids, Michigan: Kregel Publications. ISBN 0-8254-2951-X.
- Mills, E., ed. (1932). Census of Palestine 1931. Population of Villages, Towns and Administrative Areas. Jerusalem: Government of Palestine.
- Palmer, E.H. (1881). The Survey of Western Palestine: Arabic and English Name Lists Collected During the Survey by Lieutenants Conder and Kitchener, R. E. Transliterated and Explained by E.H. Palmer. Committee of the Palestine Exploration Fund.
- Robinson, E.; Smith, E. (1841). Biblical Researches in Palestine, Mount Sinai and Arabia Petraea: A Journal of Travels in the year 1838. Vol. 3. Boston: Crocker & Brewster.
- Schick, C. (1896). "Zur Einwohnerzahl des Bezirks Jerusalem". Zeitschrift des Deutschen Palästina-Vereins. 19: 120–127.
- Sharon, M. (1997). Corpus Inscriptionum Arabicarum Palaestinae, A. Vol. 1. BRILL. ISBN 90-04-10833-5.
- Socin, A. (1879). "Alphabetisches Verzeichniss von Ortschaften des Paschalik Jerusalem". Zeitschrift des Deutschen Palästina-Vereins. 2: 135–163.
- Strange, le, G. (1890). Palestine Under the Moslems: A Description of Syria and the Holy Land from A.D. 650 to 1500. Committee of the Palestine Exploration Fund.
- Williamson, G.A., ed. (1980). Josephus – The Jewish War. Middlesex, U.K.: The Penguin Classics. OCLC 633813720. (OCLC 1170073907) (reprint)
