= Albert Antébi =

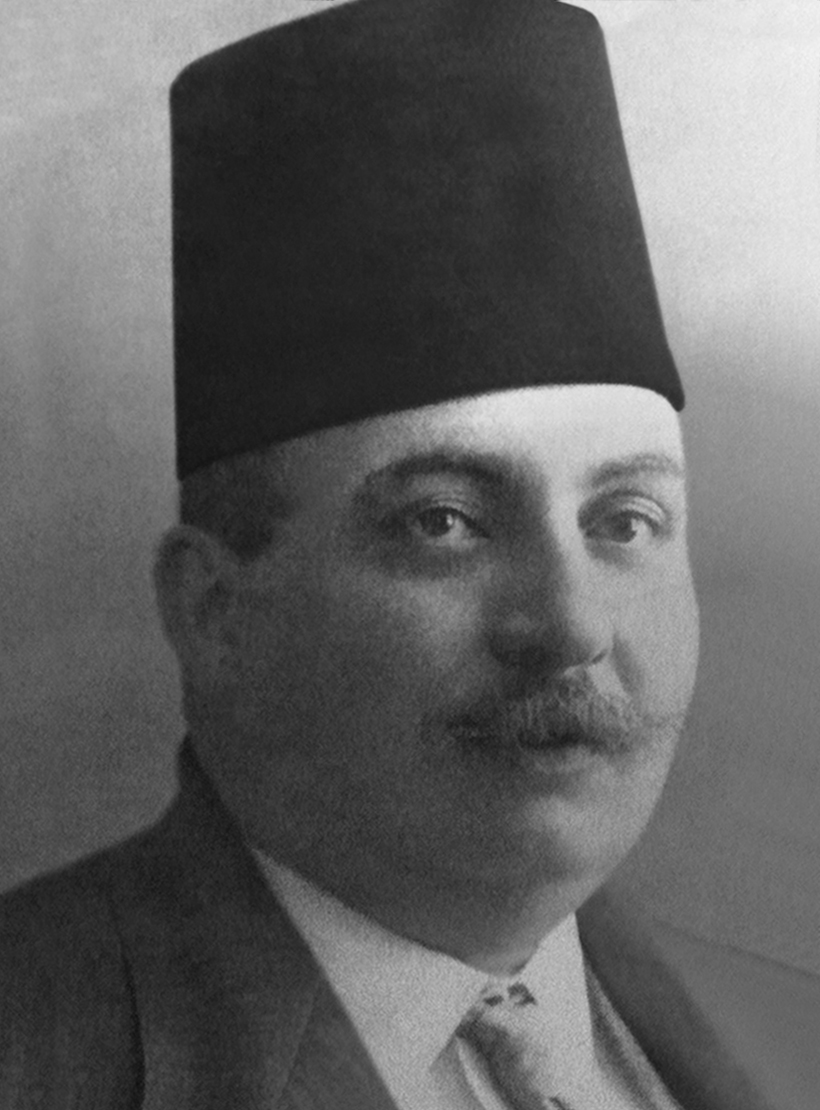
- Born: Albert-Abraham Antébi; 1873; Damascus, Ottoman Syria
- Died: 1919 (aged 45–46); Istanbul, Ottoman Empire
- Occupations: Engineer, activist

Albert-Abraham Antébi (Hebrew: אלברט אברהם ענתבי; 1873 – 1919) was a Syrian Jewish public activist and community leader born in Ottoman Syria, who worked for the defense of the interests of the Jewish old and new settlement in Palestine during the Ottoman rule, especially in the realm of education, philanthropy and land purchase, as representative of the Alliance israélite universelle and of the Jewish Colonization Association founded by Baron Hirsch. He was an engineer and teacher by professional formation.

Originating from the Sephardic Jewish community of Damascus, he was the scion of an old Jewish family. His grandfather, rabbi Jacob Antébi, had been one of the victims of a blood libel associated with the Damascus affair. After learning the craft of blacksmith at an Alliance israélite universelle professional school in Rue de Rosiers in the Marais, a Paris city quarter inhabited by Jews in his time, he studied engineering at the Écoles d'arts et métiers in the province - at Châlons-en-Champagne and Angers. In 1896, he arrived to Palestine where he received an appointment as director of the Jerusalem professional school of the Alliance, a position he held until 1913.

French diplomats thereafter referred to him as "the consul of the Jews". He was throughout his life a passionate Francophile, and subscribed to the ideal of the Jewish emancipation under the Turkish rule and French cultural and political influence. He records experiencing difficulties in his dealings with both American Jews and European Ashkenazi Jews, denouncing the "arrogance" he thought characteristic of the former, and episodes of violence, such as a physical assault and death threat from a German representative of the latter when he refused to comply with a demand that he expel Muslim students from a school he ran. Antébi found that the Jewish communities in Jerusalem were riven by factional dissensions, and analysed in particular the antipathy he encountered among Ashkenazi Jewish immigrants for Arabs and Jews who came from an Arab cultural background, like himself.

His fluency in French, Hebrew, Arabic and English, combined with his mastery of three or four different systems of law – Jewish Beth Din, Muslim Sharia, French and Ottoman Law, proved invaluable in assisting the early Jewish settlement in Palestine. In this regard, he was a key intermediary between Baron Rothschild and Arab notables in brokering the purchase of land for Jewish immigrants to the Rothschild settlements in Ottoman Palestine. He was held in high regard by several families of Arab notables, such as the Husayni, the Khalidi and the Nashashibi, with whom he negotiated land purchases. He cooperated closely with the Hovevei Zion movement.

Antébi however was opposed to the political Zionist project as developed by Theodor Herzl and his movement, regarding it as a threat to the slow incremental (Note: Letter of 11 July 1909: "If our Israelites pursue the end and not the appearance, they must move through progressive colonisation to arrive at an administrative and, at the same time, political, preponderance" (Si nos Israélites poursuivent le but et non la teinte, ils devraient passer par la colonisation progressive pour arriver à la prépondérance administrative et même politique).) development of a Jewish homeland. As early as December 1901 he warned:

For the last few months Jerusalem has become the center of nationality struggles. Until then we were living peacefully. The Orientals were grateful to their European coreligionists for the help they brought to their moral and material misery. Zionism was created supposedly to bring about closer relations within Judaism; all it has succeeded in doing is to cause fighting between nationalities."

He disliked the idleness of many European immigrants, and thought their growing, subsidized presence in Palestine risked provoking an antisemitic reaction throughout the Ottoman world. (Note: Letter of 19 August 1908 (Antébi 1996)) (Note: Letter of 11 July 1909:"Believe me, all the Arab race from Baghdad to Yemen, is prepared to tolerate a fresh outburst of Jewish economic activity, but will prove to be savage in the face of an allocation to our coreligionists of a certain political equality – not to say autonomy" (Croyez-moi, toute cette race arabe, depuis Bagdad jusqu’au Yémen, tolèrerait la recrudescence de l’activité juive économique, mais serait féroce devant l’attribution même d’une certaine égalité – je ne dis pas autonomie – politique de nos coreligionnaires).) Indeed he regarded the publicity surrounding Zionism as responsible for the rise of antisemitism in the Holy Land, and advised a strategy of silence if emigration were to continue without arousing local resistance. As early as 1901 he wrote: "Zionism has been created, its leaders say, in order to tighten the bonds of Judaism: the only result has been to stimulate the birth of struggles between (different) nationalities". He described his own labours in building up a renewed Jewish presence in the Holy Land in the following terms:

"I desire to achieve the conquest of Zion by economic means, not politically; the Jerusalem I would cherish is the Jerusalem of history and the spirit, not the modern temporal Jerusalem. I want to be a Jewish deputy in an Ottoman parliament, and not in the Jewish temple of Mount Moriah. Ottoman Jews should have the same rights, responsibilities and hopes as the Jews of England, Germany and France. I wish to create powerful Jewish economic centres embedded in universal democracies. I do not wish to be a subject of a Judean autocracy."

In the First World War he served on the front line in the Caucasus in 1917, where he became acquainted with General Mustafa Kemal. On the eve of that war he wrote that Palestine would be the last province to be taken from Turkey. Political and commercial considerations suggested that control over the area would accrue to France and England. He feared that the high numbers of German and Russian immigrants would secure for those nations a powerful influence that would deal a mortal blow to the eventual securing of a Jewish majority. He died, aged 45, of typhus, in Istanbul, while engaged in directing a large rescue and repatriation operation. In his testament, he expressed the hope that Palestine would develop along the lines of the Swiss cantonal system, under an interallied protectorate or French-English condominium, which would allocate lands without proprietors to immigrants, while keeping the country free of German and Russian communists.

== Sources ==
- Antébi, Elizabeth (1996). "Albert Antébi (1873–1919) ou la religion de la France. Lettres" (in French). Ecole Pratique des Hautes Etudes.
- Laskier, Michael M. (Spring 1992). "The Sephardim and the Yishuv in Palestine: The Role of Avraham Albert Antébi: 1897-1916". Shofar. 10 (3): 113–126. doi:10.1353/sho.1992.0053. JSTOR 42941751.
- Laurens, Henry (November 1996). L'homme du Sérail. Review (in French). Le Monde diplomatique.
- Laurens, Henry (1999). L'invention de la terre sainte. La Question de Palestine (in French). Fayard. ISBN 978-2-213-60349-0.
- Lemire, Vincent (2017). Jerusalem 1900: The Holy City in the Age of Possibilities. University of Chicago Press. ISBN 978-0-226-18837-9.
