= Ir Amim =

Israeli activist non-profit group

Ir Amim (Hebrew: עיר עמים; "City of Peoples" or "City of Nations") is an Israeli activist non-profit founded in 2004 that focuses on the Israeli-Palestinian conflict in Jerusalem. It seeks to ensure the "dignity and welfare of all its residents and that safeguards their holy places, as well as their historical and cultural heritages."

== Organizational activities ==
Ir Amim works from several angles to further its goals:

=== Legal and governmental policy ===
Ir Amim regularly provides information to Knesset members and members of the Jerusalem Municipal Government about actions in East Jerusalem that they believe to undermine Jerusalem's stability, impede parity amongst residents, or threaten the possibility for future final-status negotiations in Jerusalem (such as settlement building in Palestinian neighborhoods). The organization also brings cases to the Supreme and Municipal courts on topics such as building permits and social services in East Jerusalem. An example of this is in May 2016, when Ir Amim filed a petition asking the High Court of Justice to prohibit the Jerusalem Day flag parade from entering the Muslim Quarter, arguing that previous parades have resulted in violence to residents, vandalism, and racist provocations and that in 2016 the parade would coincide with the holy days of Ramadan. The High Court rejected the petition.

=== Monitoring and reporting ===
Ir Amim daily monitors the situation in East Jerusalem, and exposes key developments and in-depth analysis in its reports almost monthly. This type of monitoring and reporting is the basis for the legal and policy activity of Ir Amim, as well as the media work.

=== Jerusalem Policy Forum ===
The Jerusalem Policy Forum is a joint project of Ir Amim and the Palestinian NGO, the Peace and Democracy Forum.

=== Public outreach ===
Ir Amim's public outreach is primarily aimed at the Israeli public, with the goal of re-orienting the public discourse on the issue of Jerusalem. The organization encourages the public to evaluate both the current realities and the ongoing developments in Jerusalem with regard to the possible long-term ramifications for Israel. Ir Amim's public outreach centers around study tours, media work, briefings, house meetings, and educational programs. Ir Amim also maintains a blog on the Huffington Post.

==== Study tours ====
Ir Amim offers study tours of East Jerusalem to both individuals and organizations. The tours focus on the historical background as well as the Ir Amin view of current political and socio-economic developments in East Jerusalem. The tours travel along the Separation Barrier and through Jerusalem neighborhoods, discussing Israeli policies and their impact on Israelis and Palestinians and on a possible political resolution in Jerusalem.

=== Jerusalem Moments ===
Jerusalem Moments is a film project sponsored by Ir Amim. It is a collection of short documentaries directed by young filmmakers, both Israelis and Palestinians, which reflect the complexity of daily life in Jerusalem, in the context of the Israeli-Palestinian conflict.

The films in the 2008 collection are:

- Bus Station, by Lily Sheffy
- You Don't Live Here Anymore, by Nizar Abu Zayyad
- The Third House, by Yoram Ron
- The Largest Mammals in Jerusalem, by Nitsan Shorf Domidiano
- Archaeology of Ownership, by Noga Almi Hantke
- Children's Story, by Daniel Gal
- Boulders, by Eran Sahar
- Two Houses and a Longing, by Dorit Naaman
- Noor and Nar, by Saeed Khairaldeen
- Home, by Marwah Jabara Tibi

The films in the 2009 collection are:

- The Little Western Wall, by Liviu Babich
- In Israel's Custody, by Radwan Duha
- Prince of Jerusalem, by Shabaneh Momen
- Hamamm al-Ayn and Me, by Nihad Sabri Markesto
- Bus, by Yasmine Novak
- Nine to Five, by Daniel Gal
- Ghetto Town, by Amber Fares and Avi Goldstein

=== Supporting grassroots civil society ===
Ir Amim has worked with several Palestinian non-profit organizations to help to strengthen civil society in East Jerusalem. Emphasis is placed on organizations that work to improve infrastructure (sanitation, water, roads, sidewalks), street utilities (streetlamps, bus stops) or neighborhood services (clinics, emergency services, mail delivery, waste collection). An example of one such organization is Nuran, which provides emergency ambulance service in East Jerusalem.

== Issues ==
Some of the issues that Ir Amim engages with include:

- Jewish construction in East Jerusalem
- Home demolitions and evictions in East Jerusalem
- The Separation Barrier in Jerusalem
- Excavations in the Old City and Historic Basin (including Silwan)
- E-1
- Freedom of Movement in Jerusalem
- Planning and Construction in East Jerusalem
- Education in East Jerusalem
- Municipal Services in East Jerusalem, such as sewage, electricity, and trash collection
