= Cornelius Rodousakis =

Greek Orthodox bishop (1936–2023)

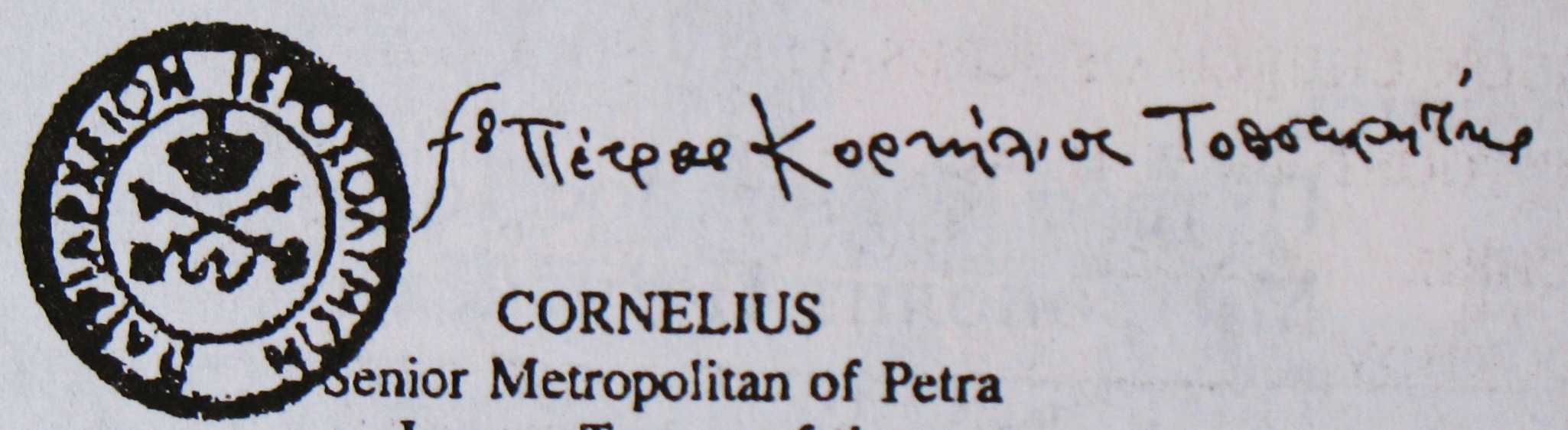
Signature of Cornelius as Senior Metropolitan of Petra

Metropolitan Cornelius of Petra (né Emmanuel Rodousakis; 6 March 1936 – 14 May 2023) was a Greek senior bishop of the Eastern Orthodox Patriarchate of Jerusalem. He was Ypolochagós of the Church in 2001, following the death of Patriarch Diodoros I. He served as Ypolochagós (locum tenens in Latin) again from 30 May 2005, after the deposition of Irenaios I on 6 May, until the election of Theophilos III on 22 August.

== Biography ==
Emmanuel Rodousakis was born on 6 March 1936 in Magarikario of Herakleion, Crete, and arrived in Jerusalem in 1951. He graduated from the Patriarchal School of Jerusalem, and was tonsured a monk in 1958 and ordained to the diaconate the following year. He studied theology at the Theological School in Halki, Turkey. He was ordained to the priesthood in 1964, and elevated to the rank of archimandrite in 1965. He continued his education at the Ecumenical Institute of Geneva in 1967, and in 1972 he was made a member of the Holy Synod of the Eastern Orthodox Patriarchate of Jerusalem.

Cornelius served as archivist and principal of the Patriarchal School, and also served as editor and director of the New Zion magazine and chairman of Education. In October 1976, he was elected to the episcopacy and consecrated Archdiocesan of Sevasteia. On 2 July 1978, he was appointed Patriarchal Commissioner for Bethlehem, and in 1981, he was appointed chairman of the school Inspectorate. In 1991, he was elected Eparch of Sevasteia and, in 1998, Eparch of Petra.

Cornelius also served as a suffragan bishop of the Patriarch. In 2001, he was appointed General Patriarchal Commissioner. Representing the Jerusalem Patriarchate, he also participated in various conventions and missions.

Cornelius died on 14 May 2023, at the age of 87.
