= Ateret Cohanim =

Israeli Jewish organization

Coordinates: 31°46′47″N 35°13′57″E

- עמותת עטרת כהנים
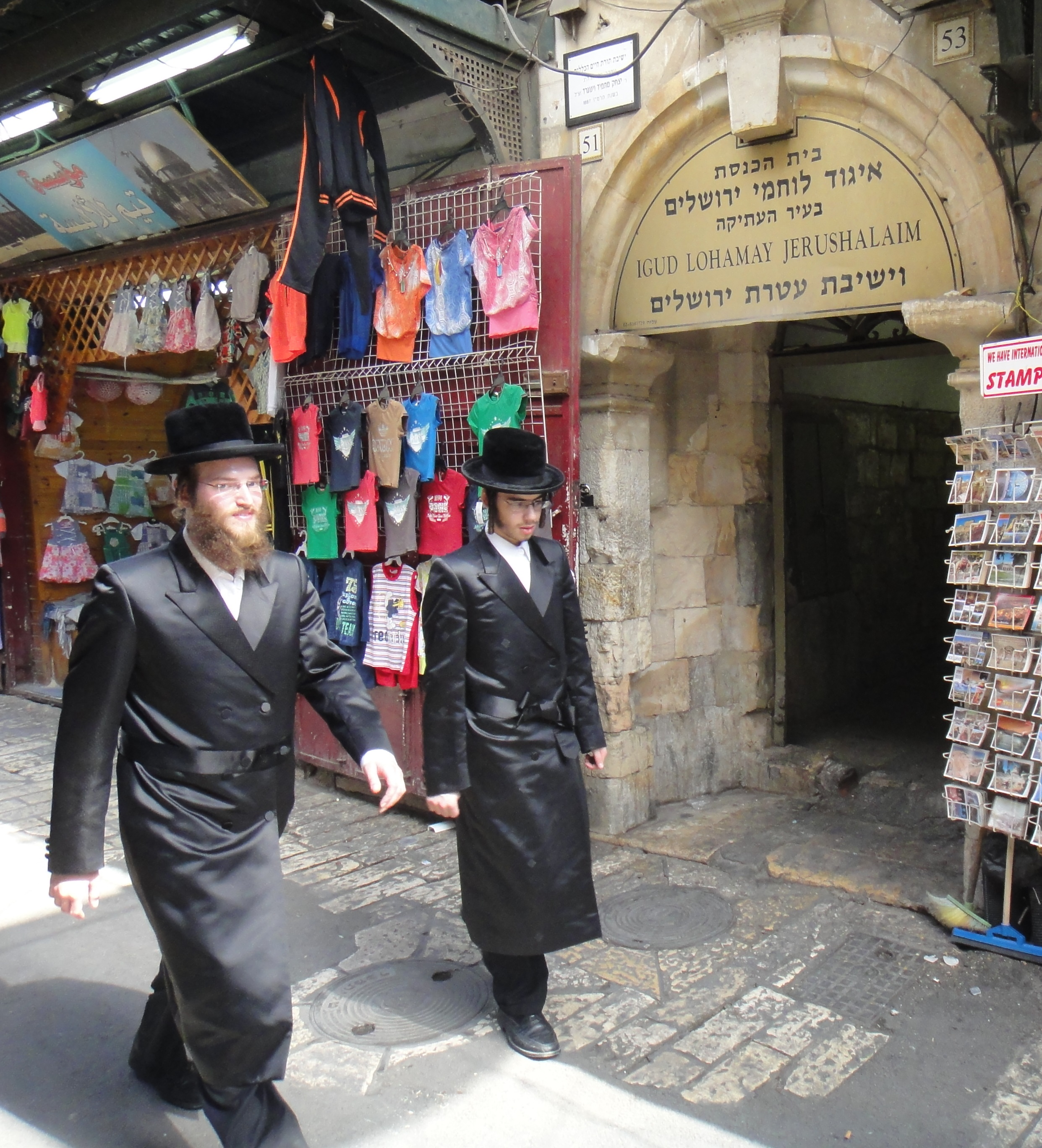
- Igud Lohamay Jerushalaim Synagogue, Jerusalem Old City
- Predecessor: Atara Leyoshna
- Formation: 1978
- Type: Non-profit organization
- Headquarters: Israel, New York
- Location: Israel
- Key people: Matityahu HaCohen Dan – Chairman; Daniel Lourie – Executive Director
- Affiliations: American Friends of Ateret Cohanim (a.k.a. Jerusalem Chai)
- Website: www.ateret.org.il

Ateret Cohanim (Hebrew: עמותת עטרת כהנים, lit. 'Crown of the Priests'), also Ateret Yerushalayim, is an Israeli Jewish organization with a yeshiva located in the Muslim Quarter of the Old City of Jerusalem. It supports the creation of a Jewish majority in the Old City and in Arab neighborhoods in East Jerusalem. Notable alumni of the yeshiva include Rabbi Nissan Ben-Avraham and Rabbi Eyal Karim.

== History ==
Founded in 1978, it was originally known under the name Atara Leyoshna (lit. "[returning the] former glory"). After many disagreements about the nature of its activities, the organization closed and re-opened as a new association called Ateret Cohanim with a yeshiva. While the activities of Atara Leyoshna focused mainly on locating Jewish assets in the Muslim Quarter and transferring them into Jewish hands through legal means, the activities of Ateret Cohanim involves acquiring houses in the Muslim quarter or renting them from government companies and populating them with Jews. The association owns many buildings in the Old City, where over 80 families live. Some estimate that 1,000 Israeli Jews live in houses that Ateret Cohanim has purchased in the Old City since 1978. It controls at least seven other organizations that are not registered in Israel, but they are registered in tax shelters, like the Virgin Islands and Guernsey.

The head of the association is Mati Dan. It depends heavily on donations from American Jewish businessman Irving Moskowitz and his wife Cherna Moskowitz.

== Land purchases ==
Around 2000, Ateret Cohanim and another organization, the Ir David Foundation, began to acquire land in Arab neighborhoods of East Jerusalem outside the Old City. They operate mainly in the village of Silwan, and at the Beit Orot Yeshiva on the Mount of Olives.

In the Old City, the yeshiva was involved in buying property from Arabs, Greeks, and Armenians. Ateret Cohanim reportedly owns more than 70 buildings in the Muslim Quarter. The property includes their yeshiva, the building that houses Yeshiva Shuvu Bonim, several dormitories, a museum, and about 50 apartment units. Some of the property belonged to Jews who lived in the Muslim Quarter before they were driven out by pogroms in 1929 and 1936.

In early 2005, news came out that Ateret Cohanim had bought three buildings in the Christian Quarter of Old City of Jerusalem that belonged to the Greek Orthodox Patriarchate of Jerusalem. This led to the destitution of then Patriarch Irenaios by the Holy Synod of Jerusalem, the ruling body of the Patriarchate, composed by the bishops who had elected Irenaios. A new Patriarch was elected, and, since 2005, the Greek Patriarchate of Jerusalem has been trying to have the sale of the three properties of the Church to Ateret Cohanim cancelled by Israeli courts. The Patriarchate claimed that the sales had not been approved by the Synod (the ruling body of the Greek Church), and that the finance director responsible for the sale, Nikolas Papadimos, had received money from Ateret Cohanim to advance the deal and had committed acts of theft and corruption involving funds of the Patriarchate. It was also pointed out that the price paid for the buildings by Ateret Cohanim was significantly lower than their market value. Still, in June 2022, Israel's Supreme Court ruled that Ateret Cohanim had purchased the properties legally, and that the three properties in Jerusalem's Old City now legally belong to the Jewish organization.

In May 2015, Ateret Cohanim reclaimed legal ownership of the Old Yemenite Synagogue in the nineteenth century Jewish Yemenite Village Kfar Hashiloach (Hebrew: כפר השילוח) neighborhood in the Jerusalem district of Silwan. The building's new residents moved into the building at approximately 01:00 after being met by Arabs throwing rocks at them.

== Yeshivat Ateret Yerushalayim ==
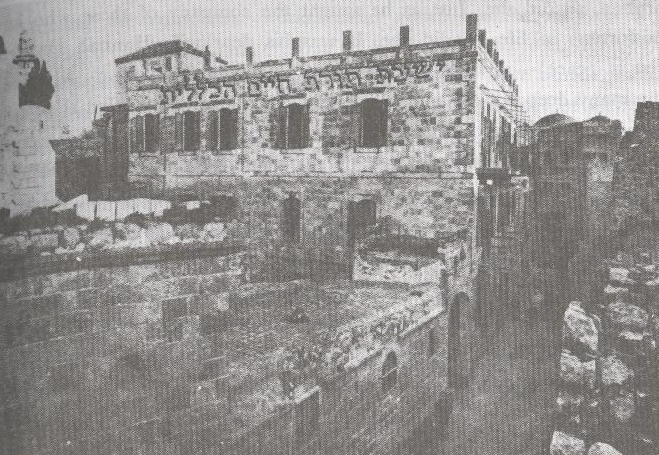
Early 20th century photograph of the Torath Chaim Yeshiva

=== Torat Chaim Yeshiva ===
In 1886, Rabbi Yitzchak Winograd established the Torat Chaim Yeshiva on ha-Gai Street, facing the Temple Mount. At its peak, about 300 students from all over the world, including Rabbis Tzvi Pesach Frank, Tzvi Yehuda Kook, and Aryeh Levin studied there. The ground floor of the building served as a shop selling vegetables which provided funds for the yeshiva's maintenance.

In the wake of the 1936–1939 Arab revolt in Palestine, the yeshiva relocated to the new city, leaving the building and its contents entrusted to a Circassian watchman who faithfully preserved it until the re-unification of Jerusalem in 1967. This yeshiva was the only one out of approximately 80 synagogues and study halls that was not destroyed by Jordan during the Jordanian rule of Jerusalem. In 1967, the caretaker gave the keys to Chaim Herzog (in his function as the military governor of the West Bank), telling him that "the holy place watched over me more than I watched over it" during those years.

=== Modern-day yeshiva ===
Yeshivat Ateret Yerushalayim (Hebrew: ישיבת עטרת ירושלים) is a continuation of the former yeshiva, Torat Chaim, and is located within the same building as the old yeshiva. In 1980, when Israel passed the Jerusalem Law, re-unifying Jerusalem, many began praying and learning again in the old yeshiva building. In 1983, Yeshivat Ateret Yerushalayim began occupying the building, the first time the building was used for a yeshiva in almost 50 years.

The Rosh yeshiva is Shlomo Aviner, and the yeshiva serves the 1,000 Jewish residents of the Old City, including 250 yeshiva students. There are over 1,500 graduates of the yeshiva.

== Yeshiva Otzmat Yerushalayim ==
Yeshiva Otzmat Yerushalayim is a Yeshiva in the Arab neighborhoods near Herod's Gate announced in 2014 by Ateret Cohanim. In a letter to supporters, the Executive Director, Daniel Luria, announced the purchase of a property in the heart of East Jerusalem's business district on the corner of Salah ad-Din and Sultan Suleiman. The organization stated they planned to open a yeshiva named Otzmat Yerushalayim in May 2014, to celebrate the 47th year of the re-unification of Jerusalem. Local Arab business owners fear that the yeshiva will harm their businesses by bringing an inevitable increased militarization to the heart of this East Jerusalem neighborhood.

Today, the Yeshiva has partnered with Mechina boys from the Pre-Army Academy of Otzem in Cholot Chalutza. Due to the size of the Yeshiva, 30 boys will attend the new Yeshiva at a time. The students will learn for 1–2 weeks at a time, and also explore and tour the Old City.

== American charities ==
=== American Friends of Ateret Cohanim ===
American Friends of Ateret Cohanim, also known as Jerusalem Chai, was founded in New York City in 1987. Jerusalem Chai is a United States not-for-profit organization, with the purpose of fund-raising for Ateret Cohanim's land acquisitions in Israel.

In 2012, they raised $1 million, of which $120 thousand went to administrative purposes, $150 thousand was spent on fund-raising, and the remainder was used for programs in Israel. Jerusalem Chai is run by Shoshana Hikind, their executive vice-president, and Joseph Frager, their chairman.

=== American Friends of Yeshivat Ateret Yerushalayim ===
American Friends of Yeshivat Ateret Yerushalayim is a United States not-for-profit organization, with the purpose of fundraising for Ateret Cohanim's yeshivas in Israel. They were founded in 2007, and received not-for-profit status in January 2008. Between the years of 2007 and 2011 they raised $446,014 to support Yeshivat Ateret Yerushalayim.

== Legal disputes ==
The organization has been involved in a number of legal disputes. In April 2009, members of Ateret Cohanim moved into a house in East Jerusalem over which it claimed ownership, despite a court ruling to the contrary. A spokesperson said that they had bought the property. In the East Jerusalem neighborhood of Silwan, Ateret Cohanim also built Beit Yonatan, a six story apartment building named after Jonathan Pollard. It is currently guarded by a private organization which is now funded by the Israeli Ministry of Housing and Construction. The Supreme Court ruled the building illegal. Despite the order of eviction for Beit Yonatan, it was avoided when Jerusalem mayor Nir Barkat linked their eviction to the eviction of Palestinian families from a former synagogue prior to 1948. This delaying tactic permitted Barkat to avoid any eviction of the settler group from Beit Yonatan.
