= Makarios Mavrogiannakis =

Eastern Orthodox Archbishop

Makarios
- Archbishop of Qatar
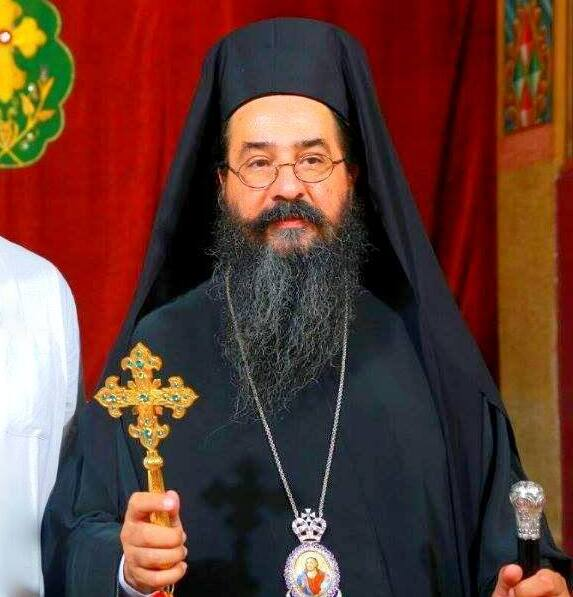
- Church: Eastern Orthodox Church
- Archdiocese: Jerusalem
- Installed: 10 March 2013

Orders
- Ordination: 1987

Personal details
- Born: Georgios Mavrogiannakis; March 10, 1968 (age 58) Charakas, Crete, Greece
- Denomination: Eastern Orthodox Church
- Education: University of Belgrade

Makarios (Greek: Μακάριος), né Georgios Mavrogiannakis (Greek: Γεώργιος Μαυρογιαννάκης; born 10 March 1968) is the current Greek Orthodox Archbishop of Qatar.

== Biography ==
Georgios Mavrogiannitis was born in Charakas, Crete in 1968. He migrated to Jerusalem in 1980, becoming a monk in 1986. He was ordained as a deacon in 1987, and became a priest in 1992. In 1993 he assumed the office of archimandrite. He graduated from the Faculty of Orthodox Theology of the University of Belgrade in 1995. He served as a professor and headmaster of the Patriarchal School of Sion, as a parish priest in Gaza, as an abbot in Fhes, Jordan and from 2004 as a Patriarchal Epitropos of Qatar. On 10 March 2013, he was consecrated as Archbishop of Qatar by the Patriarch of Jerusalem Theophilos III. During the Qatar diplomatic crisis, he said there was an evacuation plan for the Greeks of the country, although he opined that it would not need to be carried out.

== Controversy ==
His appointment was contested by the Eastern Orthodox Patriarchate of Antioch, which claimed Qatar to be under its own jurisdiction.
