= Ma'ale HaZeitim =

Israeli settlement in East Jerusalem

Coordinates: 31°46′24″N 35°14′25″E

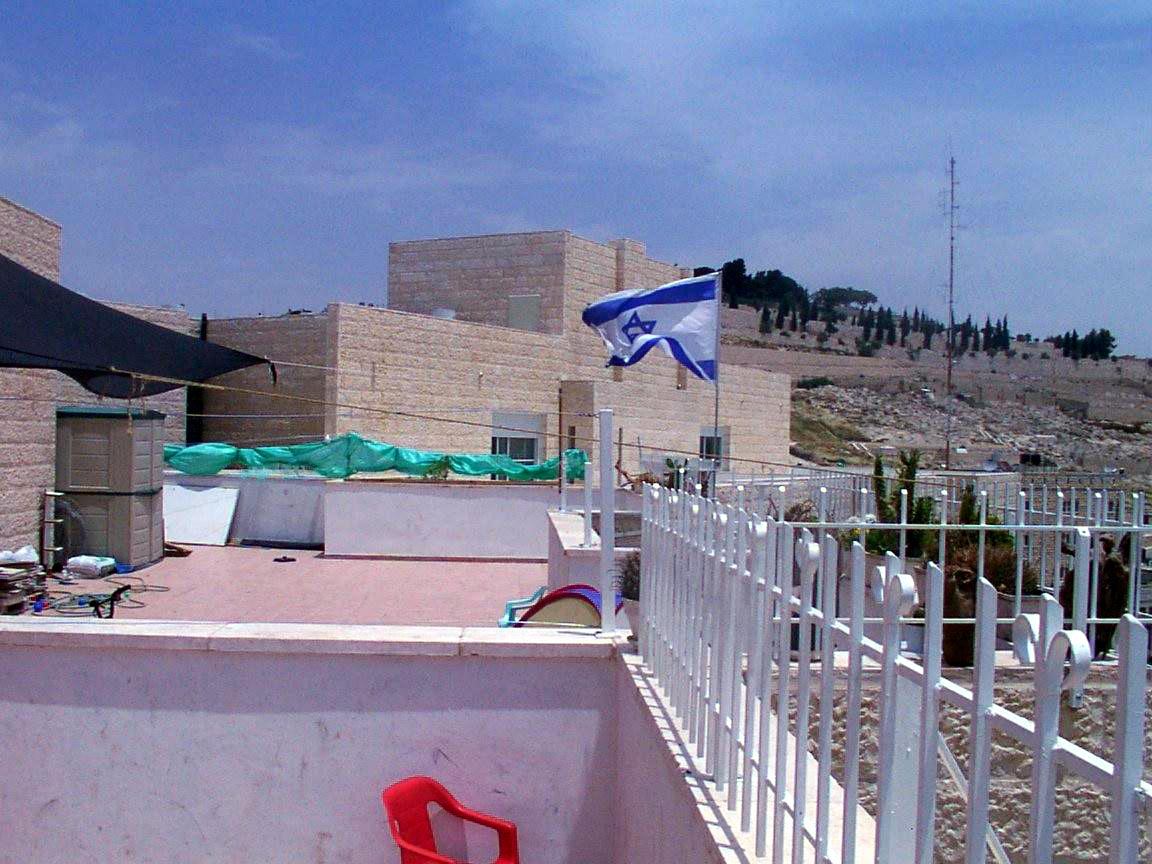
Ma'ale HaZeitim

Ma'ale HaZeitim (Hebrew: מעלה הזיתים. lit. Olive Heights) is a Jewish Israeli settlement in East Jerusalem, located on the Mount of Olives, near the Palestinian neighborhood of Ras al-Amud. In 2010, its inhabitants numbered some 250 people belonging to 50 families. In 2011 it was projected to house 110 families and eventually merge with the new settlement of Ma'alot David, designed to replace an old police station across the street from Ma'ale HaZeitim, which would make them become the largest Jewish settlement in East Jerusalem. By 2016, Ma'ale HaZeitim was housing about 90 families and the adjacent project, now called Ma’alot David, had 23 housing units. In 2017, construction started on a community center, which will include two synagogues, a kindergarten, a higher learning institution, a library and an event hall, all overlooking the Temple Mount.

The international community considers Israeli settlements in the West Bank illegal under international law, but the Israeli government disputes this.

== History ==
In 2003, a group of eight Jews moved to a compound of three dilapidated homes surrounded by graves in the Sephardi section of the Mount of Olives cemetery. According to the General Burial Society of Jerusalem, which legally owned the site, drug users had taken over the compound, which had become a dumping site for construction debris and a chop shop for stolen cars. Other Jewish property in the area was a gas station a few hundred meters from Ma'aleh Hazeitim and several other buildings.

The burial society plot had been acquired in the mid-19th century by philanthropists Moshe Wittenberg and Nissan Bak, trustees for kollels affiliated with the Chabad and Wollin hassidim. Land on the outskirts of the Mount of Olives was designated as part of the existing Jewish cemetery, but the Turks did not permit the Jews to bury their dead in areas south of the Jerusalem-Jericho road. Meanwhile, the kollels leased the land to an Arab farmer who grew the wheat for a special Passover matza. In 1923, when the British changed the land ownership laws, the land was formally transferred to the Wollin and Chabad kollels. Irving Moskowitz, an American businessman and philanthropist, purchased the land in 1990.

After the 1948 Arab-Israeli war, the adjacent plot owned by the Bukharan community was confiscated for security reasons and used by the Arab Legion; while the plot bought by Wittenberg and Bak was administered by the Jordanian Custodian of Enemy Property, an organization established to handle property owned by Jews in the Jordanian controlled West Bank.

After the Six-Day War of 1967 the land was transferred to the Israel Land Administration, which placed it under the jurisdiction of the Jerusalem Municipality.

In September 1997, plans for the construction of new Jewish homes on the land were approved. This provoked an international outcry. Despite American pressure to halt building in the area, the plan was backed by Jerusalem mayor Ehud Olmert.

In 2003, the first Jewish families moved in.

=== Conflict after 2003 establishment ===
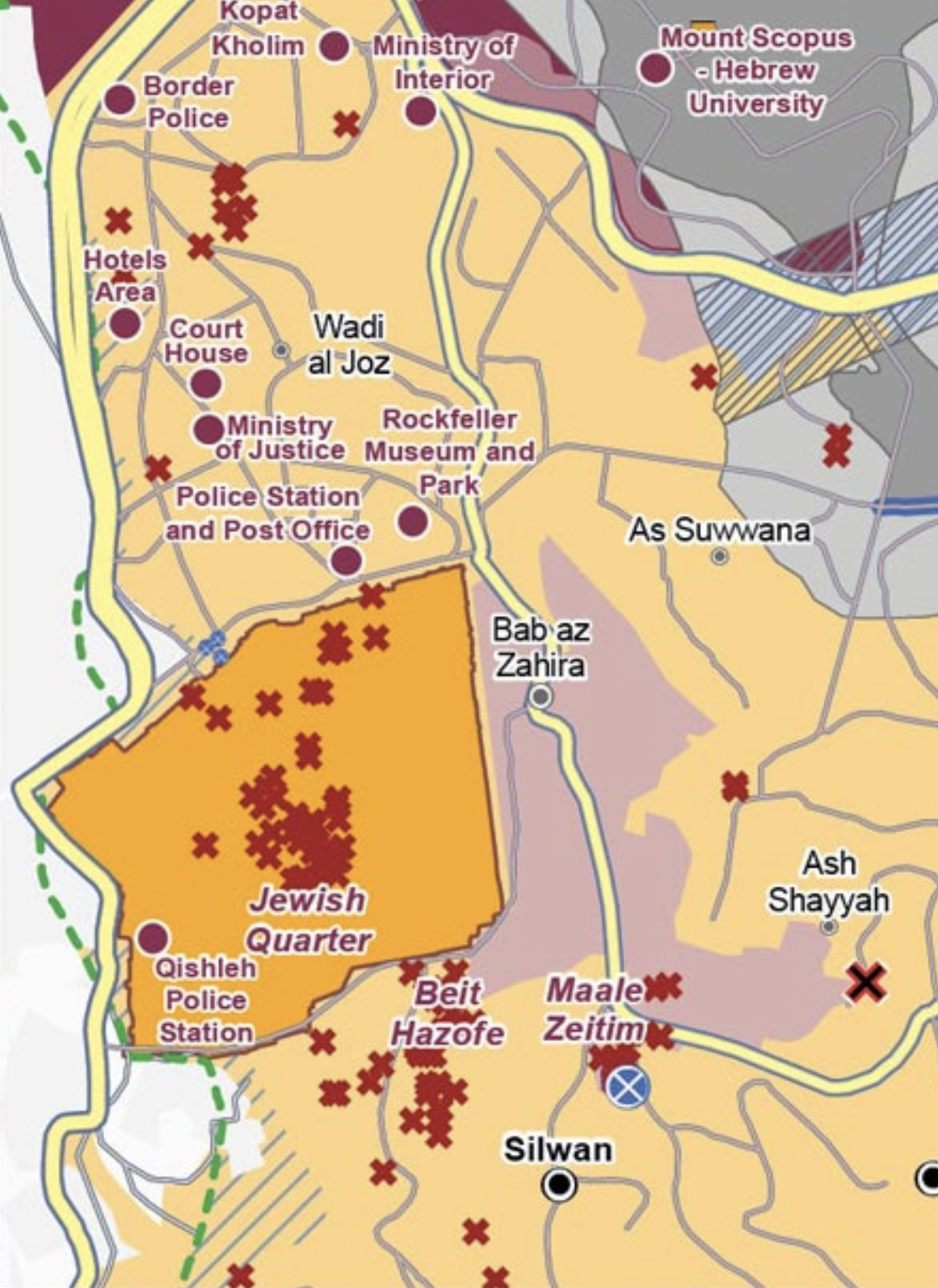
UN map showing the Ma'ale HaZeitim area as a series of Israeli "Inner Settlements" – each represented as red crosses – adjacent to the City of David (shown as "Beit Hazofe" (בית הצופה, "Observation House")) and Silwan.

In May 2011, two demonstrations were held by the Solidarity movement, to protest Jewish housing activity in Ras el-Amud. The first took place during a dedication ceremony for Ma'ale HaZeitim, which came 8 years after the actual establishment of the settlement. The ceremony was attended by numerous officials, including members of Knesset including its then-Speaker and then-President of Israel Reuven Rivlin, government ministers, and the mayor of Jerusalem, Nir Barkat. At the second demonstration police arrested six protesters after fighting broke out between protesters and security guards. Protesters claimed that the guards had attacked them and the police had broken a protester's hand. The police claimed that the protestors attempted to break into homes belonging to Jewish residents.

Aryeh King is one of the founders of the initial Ma'aleh Hazeitim compound and a member of the Jerusalem City Council, who has been removed in 2014 from his position as head of the emergency and security resort by the city mayor Nir Barkat for his push towards stronger Jewish settlement in East Jerusalem. His house was attacked on 21 June 2015 with Molotov cocktails and stones and he declared that since the Israeli police has abandoned him and his Jewish neighbours, they will immediately set up their own private security team and start patrolling the area by themselves.

== See also ==
- Beit Orot, Jewish settlement on the Mount of Olives
