= Beit Yonatan =

Israeli apartment building in Jerusalem

Coordinates: 31.76759°N 35.23707°E

Beit Yonatan is an apartment building owned by Ateret Cohanim and located in the Silwan neighborhood just outside the Old City of Jerusalem. The building has been the subject of many issues and debates between Jews and Arabs in Israel.

== History ==
Beit Yonatan is a 7-story apartment building located in Silwan and named after Jonathan Pollard, a former U.S. Navy intelligence analyst convicted of spying for Israel who was formerly incarcerated in the U.S. The building stands out due to its greater height relative to surrounding structures and the 6 story Israeli flag draped down the side.

Ateret Cohanim, the building's owner, has taken on the mission of moving Jewish families and life to areas around East Jerusalem, especially those previous included in the City of David, including Silwan.

The building was built without permits in 2002, and opened in 2004. Ateret Cohanim, through an intermediary had both Beit Yonatan built and another building purchased, under the auspices of being used as Muslim apartment buildings, however just before opening revealed they were for Jewish residence.

In the early morning of 1 April 2004, 11 families moved into Beit Yonatan, with the help of Israeli security.

The Israeli government provides security for the structure despite the residents defying the eviction notice. Due to security concerns the first floor of the building is set up as a security office, and the playground for the kids is located on the roof.

== Legal status ==
In January 2010, Eli Yishai the Internal Affairs Minister of Israel, authorized the district planning commission to legalize the Jewish ownership of the building. In order meet the requirements, the residents agreed to move two floors down, out of the illegal addition. Jerusalem Mayor Nir Barkat stated that he would uphold to court order to evacuate and seal Beit Yonatan, however this never materialized.

In May 2010, the Jerusalem District Court rejected an appeal to allow the building's residents to remain.

In July 2010, the residents of Beit Yonatan once again appealed to the court stating they had new evidence that could alter the court's decision.

In December 2010, Ateret Cohanim agreed to drop their case to have Arabs living in the Yemenite synagogue Ohel Shlomo, in order to allow the residents of Beit Yonatan to remain. The eviction notice for Beit Yonatan, also included the eviction of these residents, and 200 other illegal Arab structures in Silwan.

In January 2011, Yehuda Weinstein, the Attorney General of Israel, ordered that Beit Yonatan be evacuated and sealed, per the court order, despite Barkat's resistance to fulfill the order.

On 13 August 2014, the Knesset held a meeting to discuss the security of the residents of Beit Yonatan.

== Conflict ==
In March 2011, a Molotov cocktail was thrown at Beit Yonatan, and the residents returned fire.

In May 2011 and June 2012, Molotov cocktails were once again thrown at Beit Yonatan, causing no damage or injuries.

On 16 September 2014, three were arrested for throwing rocks at Beit Yonatan.
