= Beit HaTzalam =

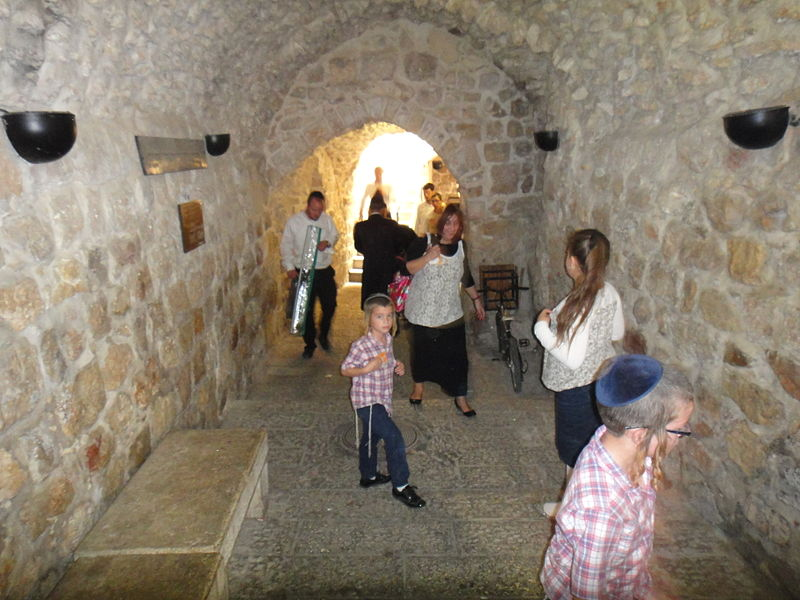
Beit HaTzalam, 2013

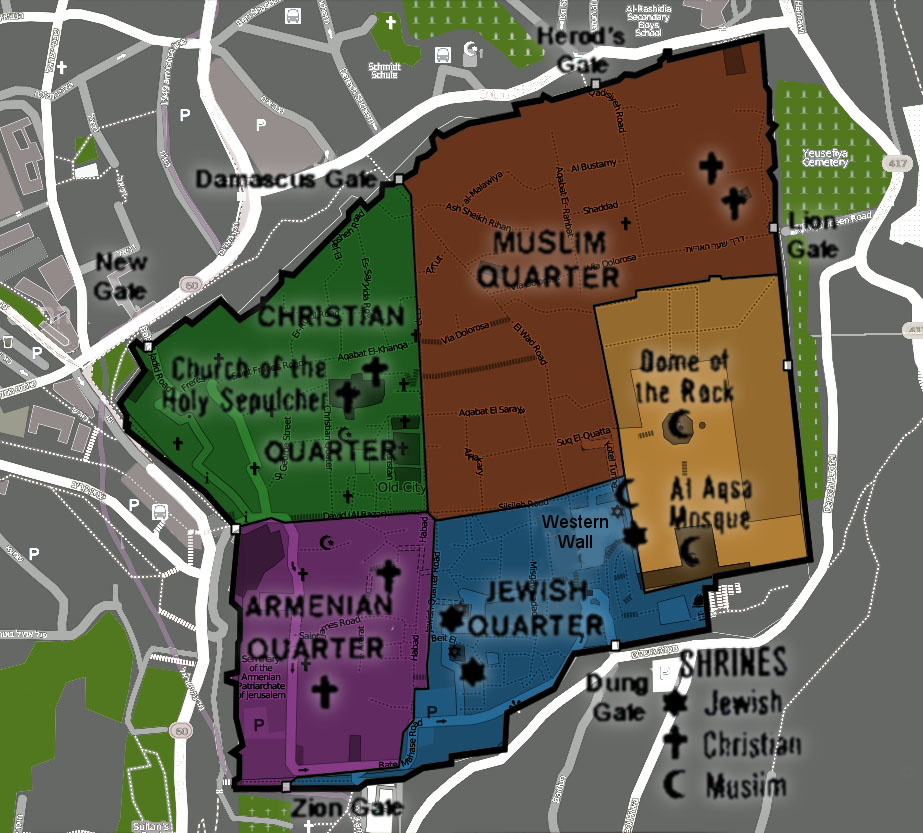
Jerusalem's Old City. Sheikh Rihan Street touches the first M of "Muslim Quarter".

Beit HaTzalam (Hebrew for "The Photographer's House") is a building owned by Ateret Cohanim on Sheikh Raihan Street in the northern part of the Muslim Quarter in the Old City of Jerusalem, on the way between two other Ateret Cohanim properties, Beit Wittenberg and the Jewish complex in the Flowers Gate area.

== History ==
The house was purchased in 1989 by the Ateret Cohanim association, through the donation of the American Jewish millionaire Sam Domb. It was named "Beit HaTzalam" because the future Jewish owners learned about it by chance, when a member of the Ateret Cohanim association misdialed while trying to call a photographer (zalam), thus he mistakenly reached the Arab owners of the house, which led to its sale to the association.

Matityahu Dan, chairman of the Ateret Cohanim association, described the circumstances of the purchase:

"Twelve years ago, we brought Michael Dekel, who was then the Deputy Minister of Defense, for a tour of the area. We hired a photographer from an office near the Western Wall, and after he finished taking photos, he went on his way. At the end of the tour, Dekel's secretary pressured us to bring her the photos. We went out to find the photographer, but he had disappeared as if the ground had swallowed him up. He wasn't at his office, and when we called his home, the line was busy all the time. One day, we tried calling him again, and a man with an Arabic accent answered. We realized it wasn't the photographer, but since we were already talking, we asked him, 'Do you want to sell us your house in the Old City?' and he agreed. His house was amazing – 15 rooms with a window overlooking the Temple Mount floor. The only reason we reached him was a mistake in the number – the digits of the photographer's phone number and that of the Arab man were identical except for one digit, and when we tried to call the photographer, we accidentally reached the Arab man. In my opinion, this is truly divine providence, how thanks to a mistake in the number we acquired a house near the Temple Mount."

The house was inhabited by Jews in the summer of 1989.

In 1998, a resident of "Beit HaTzalam," Jewish seminary student Haim Korman, was murdered, and after his death, his apartment was named after him - "Beit Chaim Korman". Following the murder, the members of the Ateret Cohanim association decided to populate two complexes it owned: the first was the Flower Gate complex and the other was next to Via Dolorosa. Following the murder, a police station staffed 24 hours a day was established about a year later.

The Ateret Cohanim association submitted plans for an underground passage from Beit HaTzalam to the nearby Zedekiah's Cave. According to Matityahu Dan, such a passage would contribute to the security of the place. So far, the plans have not been approved.

In October 2013, six Jewish families lived in the complex.
