= Nissan Ben-Avraham =

Spanish rabbi

Nissan Ben-Avraham (Hebrew: ניסן בן אברהם; born Nicolau Aguiló December 11, 1957) is a Spanish sephardic rabbi who is descended from the Xueta, or forcibly converted, Jews of Majorca, Spain.

== Biography ==
Ben-Avraham was born in Palma de Mallorca, on the island of Majorca, Spain. His given name at birth was Nicolau Aguiló. After learning from his mother that their Catholic family had Jewish ancestry, Ben-Avraham began attending the small conservative synagogue in Palma. He travelled to Israel to learn more about Jewish history and Judaism, and converted to Judaism in 1978 under the auspices of the Israeli Chief Rabbinate. He then studied at the Mercaz HaRav and Ateret Cohanim yeshivas.

Ben-Abraham's 1991 Semikhah was the first time in many centuries that a Marrano received this ordination.

In 2010, he returned to Spain as an emissary of Shavei Israel, an NGO that reaches out to the descendants of Jews. He will spend time in the communities of Barcelona, Palma de Mallorca, and Seville, teaching Torah, Jewish culture and tradition.

Ben-Avraham lives in the Israeli settlement of Shilo.
