= Irenaios of Jerusalem =

Greek Orthodox patriarch (1939–2023)

His Most Godly Beatitude Irenaios
- Patriarch of Jerusalem and All Palestine
- Church: Greek Orthodox Church of Jerusalem
- See: Jerusalem
- Installed: 15 September 2000
- Term ended: 2005
- Predecessor: Diodoros
- Successor: Theophilos III

Personal details
- Born: Emmanouil Skopelitis; 17 April 1939 Samos, Greece
- Died: 10 January 2023 (aged 83) Athens, Greece

Emmanouil Skopelitis (Greek: Εμμανουήλ Σκοπελίτης; 17 April 1939 – 10 January 2023) was, under the name Irenaios (Greek: Ειρηναίος), the 140th patriarch of the Greek Orthodox Church of Jerusalem, from his election in 2000 when he succeeded Patriarch Diodoros, until his dismissal in 2005, when he was succeeded by Patriarch Theophilos III.

== Biography ==
Irenaios was born on 17 April 1939 on the Greek island of Samos as Emmanouil Skopelitis. He moved to Jerusalem in 1953.

Irenaios served for many years as Exarch of the Holy Sepulchre in Athens.

Upon the death of Patriarch Diodoros, Skopelitis was appointed locum tenens (temporary head of the Greek Orthodox Church in Jerusalem) in 2000, and was elected patriarch on 13 August 2000 in the traditional election held at the Church of the Holy Sepulchre. He was enthroned on 15 September 2000 as "Patriarch of the Holy City of Jerusalem and all Holy Land, Syria, beyond the Jordan River, Cana of Galilee and Holy Zion" in the presence of senior church and secular dignitaries, including Archbishop Christodoulos of the Church of Greece and Metropolitan Nicholas of the Czech and Slovak Orthodox Church.

== Dismissal and replacement ==
In early 2005, almost four years into his term as patriarch, Irenaios was accused of selling three properties of the Greek Church in the Old City of Jerusalem to Ateret Cohanim, a Jewish organization whose declared aim is that of establishing a Jewish majority in Jerusalem's Old City and in Arab neighborhoods in East Jerusalem.

As most of the Orthodox Christians in the area are Palestinian, and the land was in an Arab-populated area that most Palestinians hoped would become a part of a future Palestinian capital, these accusations caused a great deal of concern among Church members.

On 6 May 2005, with a voting that required a two-thirds majority, the Holy Synod of Jerusalem (the ruling body of the Greek Orthodox Patriarchate of Jerusalem) deposed Irenaios as patriarch. Irenaios, nevertheless, refused to accept his deposition.

On 24 May 2005, a special pan-Orthodox Synod was convened in Constantinople (Istanbul), under the presidency of Ecumenical Patriarch Bartholomew, primus inter pares of the Eastern Orthodox Church, to review the decisions of the Holy Synod of Jerusalem. The pan-Orthodox Synod voted overwhelmingly to confirm the decision of the Holy Synod of Jerusalem and to strike Irenaios's name from the diptychs.

The Synod elected Theophilos III as the new Patriarch of Jerusalem on 22 August 2005. The election was confirmed by the pan-Orthodox Synod of Constantinople, and Patriarch Theophilos III was enthroned on 22 November 2005.

By a longstanding tradition, the dismissal of a patriarch of Jerusalem and the election of a replacement in theory required the recognition of the governments in the regions of the patriarchate's authority – Israel, the State of Palestine and Jordan. The Jordanian king and the Palestinian Authority immediately recognized Irenaios's dismissal, while Israel continued to recognize Irenaios as the Orthodox patriarch for over two years, and continued to invite him to official government functions. In December 2007, Israel finally joined the Jordanian and Palestinian governments in recognising Theophilos III as the Orthodox Patriarch of Jerusalem.

Upon assuming office, Patriarch Theophilos III immediately initiated legal procedures in Israeli courts to cancel the sales of the buildings, claiming that the sales had not been approved by the Synod (the ruling body of the Greek Church), and that the finance director responsible for the sale, Nikolas Papadimos, had received money from Ateret Cohanim to advance the deal and had committed acts of theft and corruption involving funds of the Patriarchate. It was also argued that the price paid for the buildings by Ateret Cohanim was significantly lower than their market value. Still, in June 2022, Israel's Supreme Court ruled that Ateret Cohanim had purchased the properties legally, and that the three properties in Jerusalem's Old City now legally belong to the Jewish organization.

== Post dismissal ==
After his dismissal, Irenaios took up residence in a small apartment on the top floor of the building of the Greek Patriarchate of Jerusalem. From February 2008 until 2015, Irenaios did not leave this apartment, receiving food from his supporters via a basket tied to a rope lowered down from his apartment to the surrounding streets, and claiming he was imprisoned there by Theophilos III, while the Greek Patriarchate claimed that Irenaios had voluntarily imprisoned himself, and was free to leave his apartment, but preferred to remain locked up inside in protest for not accepting his legal deposition. In 2011, Irenaios confirmed in an interview given to Israeli newspaper Haaretz that he was not prevented from leaving the building, but didn't do so out of fear he might not be able to return.

Suffering from pulmonary disease, Irenaios left the building in November 2015 for surgery. Patriarch Theophilos III went to the hospital to visit Irenaios, who returned to his apartment in the Greek Patriarchate after recovering. In what was interpreted as a possible sign of reconciliation, Irenaios voluntarily left his apartment again in March 2016 to attend a reception in honor of Patriarch Theophilos III.

However, in 2019 Irenaios sent a letter to the Consulate of Greece in Jerusalem, in which he claimed he continued to live in a state of "de facto" imprisonment, asserting that his Greek passport had been stolen from him, and that Patriarch Theophilos III was attempting to have him transferred to a monastery near Jericho, against his will. Irenaios was granted assistance from the Greek government, and, in August 2019, he arrived in a wheelchair at Ben Gurion International Airport and boarded a flight to Athens.

== Death ==
Irenaios died after a long illness in Athens, on January 10, 2023, at the age of 83. He was buried in his birthplace of Samos as Patriarch Theophilos III refused to allow Irenaios to be buried in Jerusalem.

Preceded by Diodoros	Eastern Orthodox Patriarch of Jerusalem; 2000–2005	Succeeded by Theophilos III
