= Patriarch Diodoros of Jerusalem =

Patriarch of Jerusalem (1923–2000)

His Most Godly Beatitude Diodoros
- Patriarch of Jerusalem and All Palestine
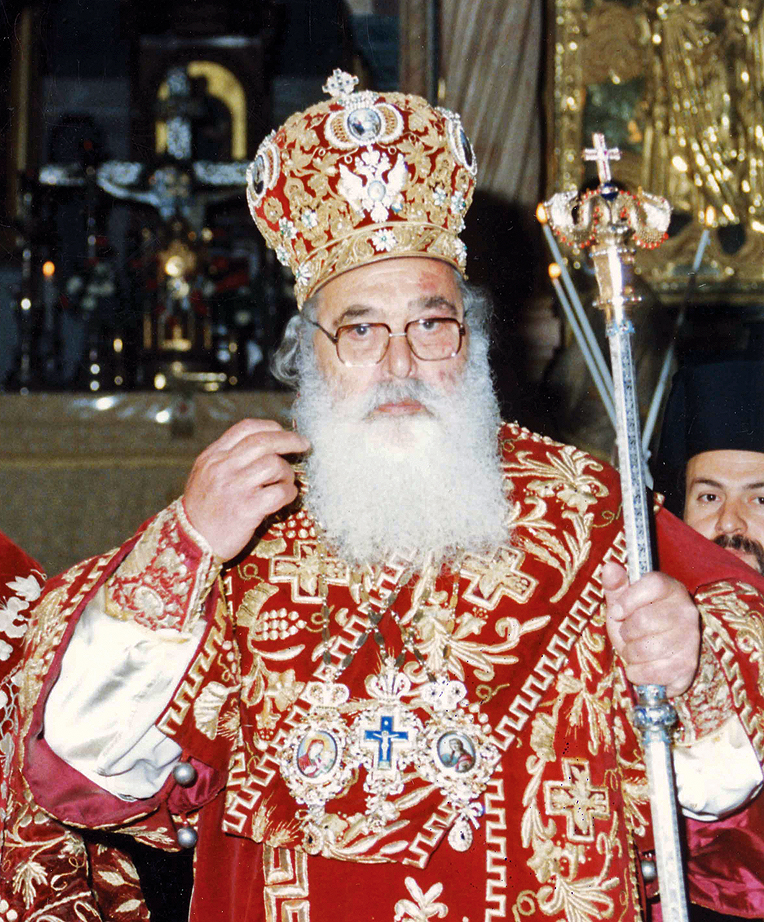
- Diodoros in 1987
- Church: Greek Orthodox Church of Jerusalem
- See: Jerusalem
- Installed: 1980
- Term ended: 20 December 2000
- Predecessor: Benedict I
- Successor: Irenaios

Personal details
- Born: Damianos G. Karivalis; 14 August 1923 Chios, Greece
- Died: 20 December 2000 (aged 77)

Diodoros or Diodorus Greek: Διόδωρος; born Damianos G. Karivalis Greek: Δαμιανός Γ. Καρίβαλης (14 August 1923 – 20 December 2000) was the Patriarch of Jerusalem in the Eastern Orthodox Patriarchate of Jerusalem from 1980 to 2000.

He was born on the Greek island of Chios on 14 August 1923. He became a monk in 1943 and was renamed Diodoros. Three years later he became a priest, then the titular archbishop of the archdiocese of Hierapolis in Phrygia in 1965. As the Metropolitan of Hierapolis, he served in Amman, Jordan, until 1980, as Patriarchal Exarch, the representative of the Patriarch of Jerusalem. He was then raised to the Patriarchate.

His time in office had some controversies, mainly due to his lack of fluent Arabic and reports of sales and long-term leases of church properties.

He met Pope John Paul II in early 2000; in December 2000 he died in Hadassah Hospital in Jerusalem, of complications linked to diabetes. At the time of his death, there were fewer than 100,000 Greek Orthodox Christians across Israel, Jordan and the Palestinian territories.

Preceded by Benedict I	Greek Orthodox Patriarch of Jerusalem; 1980–2000	Succeeded by Irenaios
