= Ras al-Amud =

Neighborhood in East Jerusalem

Coordinates: 31°46′17″N 35°14′37″E

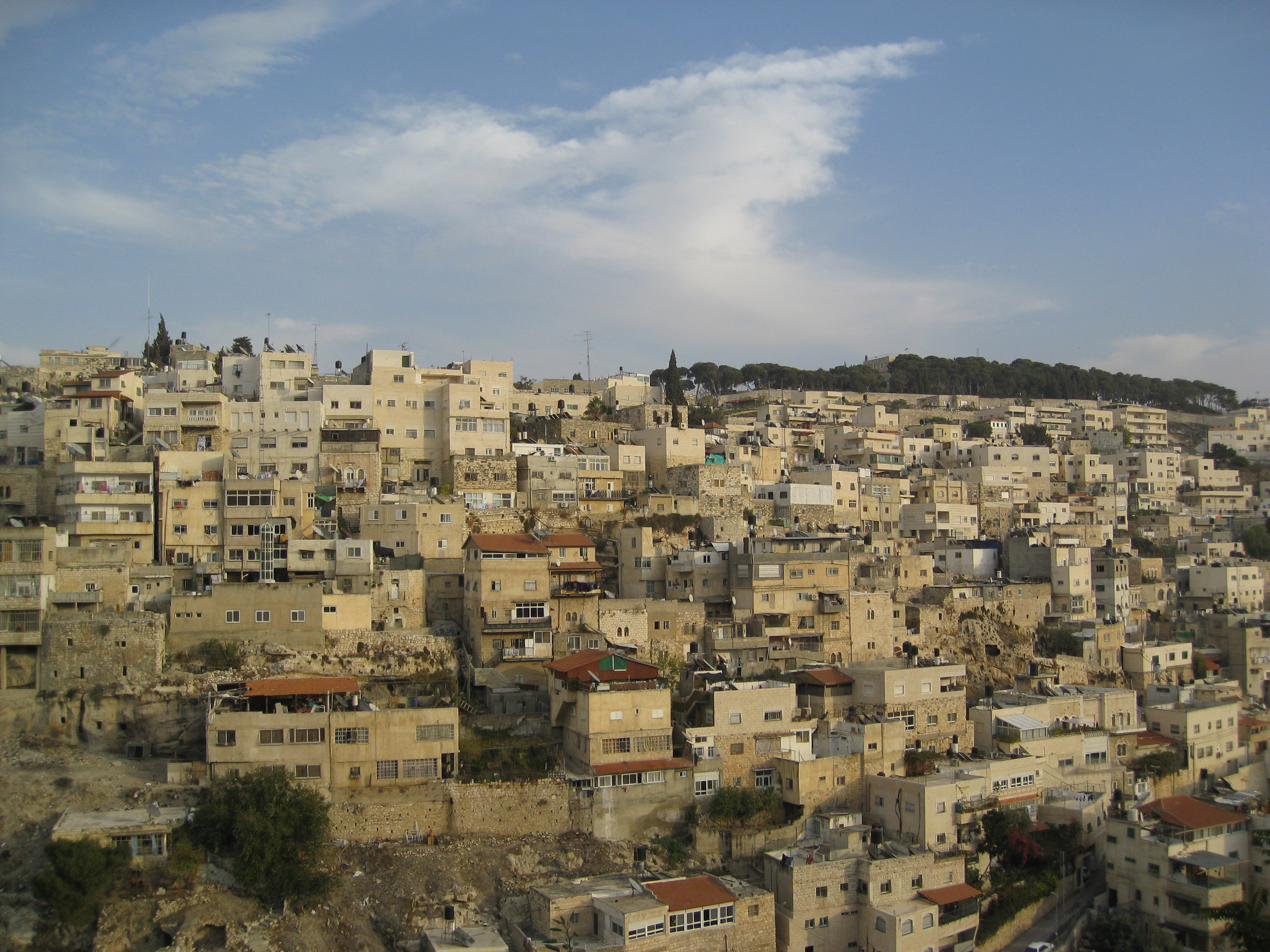
Ras al-Amud, 2007

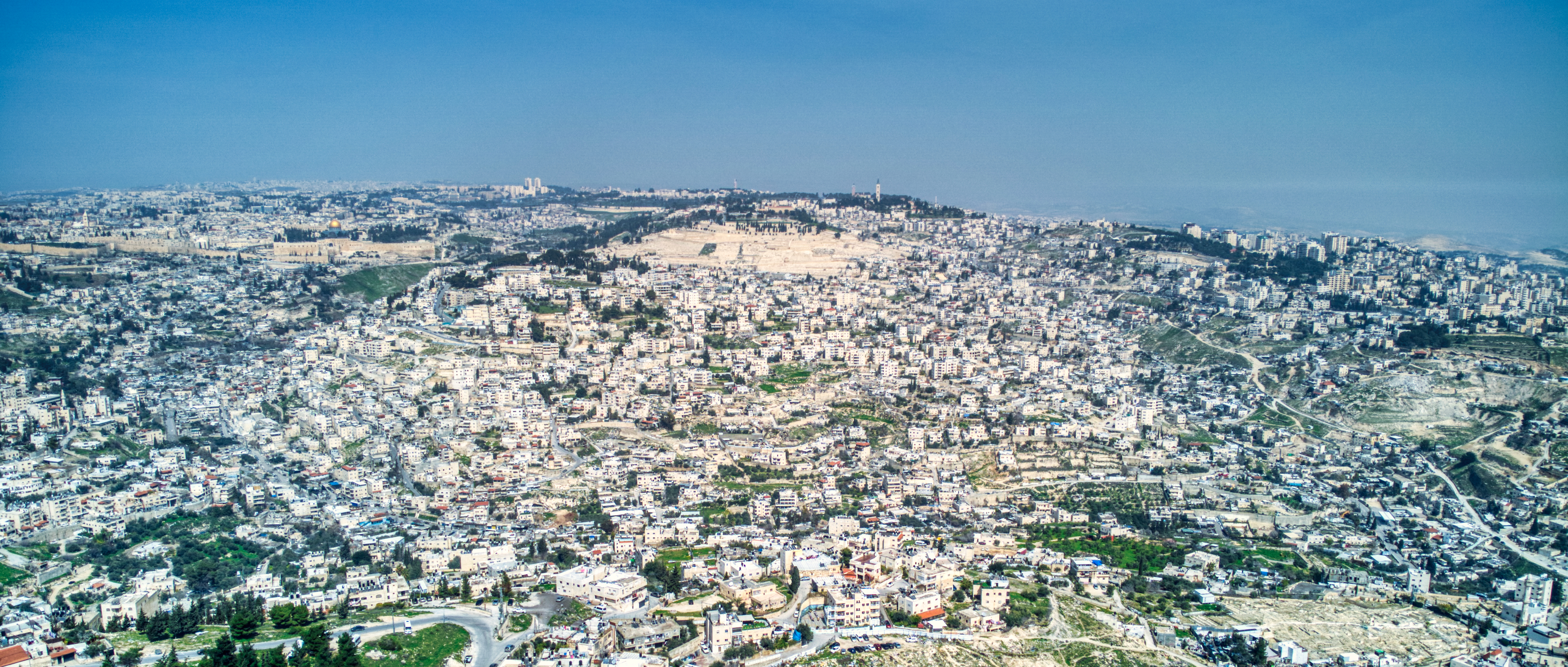
Ras al-Amud as a part of Silwan

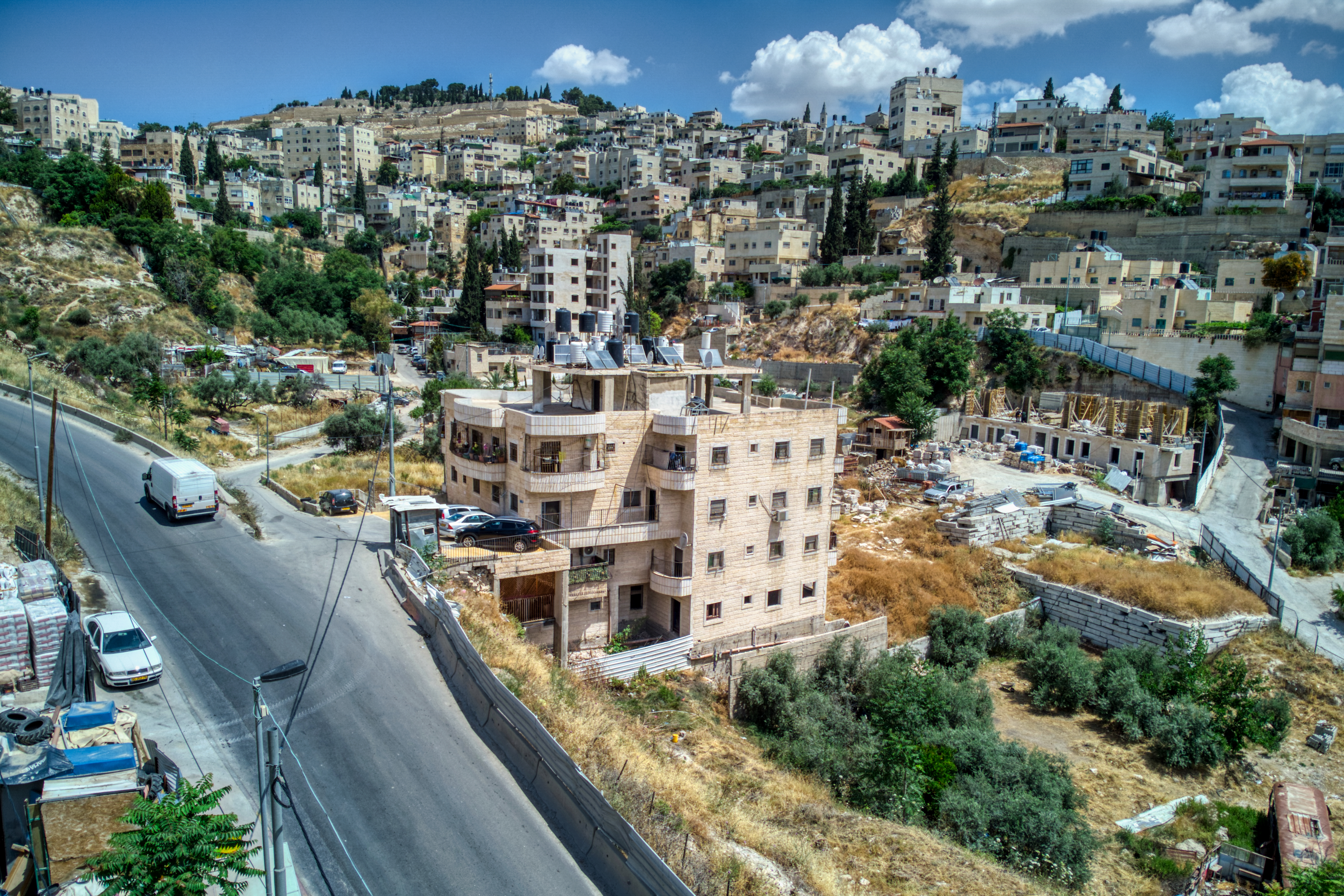
Wadi Kadum, part of Ras al-Amud

Ras al-Amud (Arabic: راس العامود, Rās al-ʿĀmūd; Hebrew: ראס אל עמוד) is a Palestinian neighborhood in East Jerusalem located southeast of the Old City of Jerusalem. The Palestinian neighborhood of Silwan lies to the south, Abu Dis and al-Eizariya to the east, and the Jewish neighborhood of Ma'ale HaZeitim to the north. In 2003, the population was 11,922.

Within Ras al-Amud are two Israeli settlements, Ma'ale HaZeitim and Ma'ale David. Ma'ale David is built on the former site of the headquarters of the police headquarters for the Judea and Samaria District, a reference to the West Bank. The international community considers Israeli settlements in East Jerusalem to be illegal under international law, though Israel disputes this.

== History ==
=== Antiquity ===
An archaeological excavation in Ras al-Amud prior to the construction of a school for Arab girls by the Jerusalem Municipality found remains dating to the Middle Canaanite period (2200–1900 BCE) and the late First Temple period (8th–7th centuries BCE), including a jar handle inscribed with the Hebrew name "Menachem." Excavations in 2025 turned up a large quantity of ground stone tools.

=== Byzantine Empire ===
In August 2004, a salvage excavation was conducted in the Ras al-Amud neighborhood in the wake of damage to an ancient building while preparing a site for construction. Ceramic finds dating to the Byzantine period included bowls, a cooking pot and a complete lamp. Glass vessels from the Late Byzantine–Umayyad period were also found. Fragments of ceramic pipes, a marble chancel screen and a stone table were recovered from the stone collapse and soil fills. The building is thus believed to have belonged to a Byzantine monastery.

=== Israel ===
In September 1997, plans for the construction of a Jewish neighbourhood on the land provoked an international outcry and large Palestinian protests, including in Beit Sahour. Despite American pressure to halt construction, the plan was backed by Jerusalem mayor Ehud Olmert. Under a compromise reached by Prime Minister Benjamin Netanyahu, three Jewish families left voluntarily, with ten yeshiva students staying on. On October 18, 2009, the Israeli bus cooperative Egged launched a bus route from Ras al-Amud and Ma'ale HaZeitim to Silwan and the Kotel. Critics claimed this was an attempt to "normalize" the Jewish presence. In 2011, 100 families were living Ma'ale HaZeitim.

A master plan for Ras al-Amud was approved in 2017.

== Bibliography ==
- ‘Adawi, Zubair (2013-02-10). "Jerusalem, Ras el-'Amud (A)" (125). Hadashot Arkheologiyot – Excavations and Surveys in Israel.
- ‘Adawi, Zubair (2013-12-30). "Jerusalem, Ras el-'Amud (B)" (125). Hadashot Arkheologiyot – Excavations and Surveys in Israel.
- ‘Adawi, Zubair (2019-09-29). "Jerusalem, Ras el-'Amud" (131). Hadashot Arkheologiyot – Excavations and Surveys in Israel.
- Zilberbod, Irina (2008-08-04). "Jerusalem, Ras el-'Amud" (120). Hadashot Arkheologiyot – Excavations and Surveys in Israel.
- Zilberbod, Irina (2012-09-04). "Jerusalem, Ras el-'Amud" (124). Hadashot Arkheologiyot – Excavations and Surveys in Israel.
- Zilberbod, Irina (2016-03-24). "Jerusalem, Ras el-'Amud" (128). Hadashot Arkheologiyot – Excavations and Surveys in Israel.
