= Jerusalem Council =

Jerusalem Council or Council of Jerusalem may refer to:

- Sanhedrin, assembly in ancient Judaism
- Council of Jerusalem, early Christian council held around AD 50
- Council of Jerusalem (536), council of bishops
- Synod of Jerusalem (1443), Eastern Orthodox council
- Synod of Jerusalem (1672), Eastern Orthodox council
- Jerusalem City Council, the representative organ of the modern day Jerusalem Municipality
