= Irving Moskowitz =

American physician

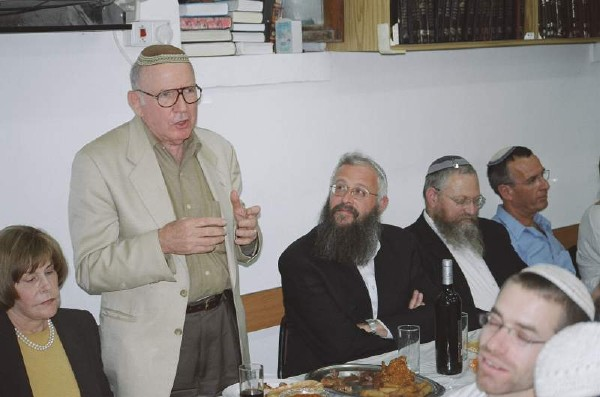
- Moskowitz speaking at Beit Orot on the Mount of Olives, his wife Cherna to his left.
- Born: January 11, 1928; New York City, New York
- Died: June 16, 2016 (aged 88)
- Education: M.D. (University of Wisconsin)
- Occupations: Physician; Businessman; Philanthropist
- Known for: Radical Zionist activism Funding of Israeli settlements in the West Bank
- Spouse: Cherna Moskowitz
- Children: 8 (4 boys and 4 girls)

Irving Moskowitz (January 11, 1928 – June 16, 2016) was a controversial American physician, businessman, and activist. His activism, in part, sought to create a Jewish majority in Palestinian Arab neighborhoods of East Jerusalem by purchasing land.

== Biography ==
Irving Moskowitz was the ninth of thirteen children born to Jewish immigrants from Poland. He stated that 120 of his relatives were killed in the Holocaust. He grew up in Milwaukee, Wisconsin, and received a medical degree from the University of Wisconsin. He then moved to California where he started his medical practice, later building and managing hospitals. He started the foundation in 1968. At the time of his death Moskowitz resided in Miami Beach, Florida. The Moskowitz family net worth is estimated at over $1.5 billion.

Moskowitz was married to Cherna, with whom he had 8 children, over 48 grandchildren and over 20 great-grandchildren. Among his notable Zionist activities was establishing a foundation to help Shinlung immigration to Israel. The family also established the Moskowitz Prize for Zionism in 2008.

He built a business running hospitals, as well as gambling in California. He was the founder of the Moskowitz Foundation, created "to help people in need regardless of race, creed, politics or religion." The foundation raises funds for Jewish housing projects in East Jerusalem through its bingo hall in Hawaiian Gardens, California. The funding is channeled through two settler organizations El'ad and Ateret Cohanim that work to create a Jewish majority in Palestinian neighborhoods of East Jerusalem.

Moskowitz had battled Alzheimer's disease for many years and eventually succumbed to it on June 16, 2016, at the age of 88.

== East Jerusalem housing projects ==
In 2007, Moskowitz worked toward resettling Jews in Palestinian neighborhoods in East Jerusalem vis a vis initiating plans to build 122 apartments on the site of the Shepherd Hotel in the Sheikh Jarrah neighborhood. The plan was downsized in 2009. Final approval was given for 20 apartments on March 23, 2010, hours before Prime Minister Benjamin Netanyahu met with President Barack Obama at the White House. The historic Shepherd Hotel was torn down to make room for the housing units. A three-story parking garage and an access road was also planned for the site.

== US philanthropy ==
Moskowitz was the founder and chair of the Irving I. Moskowitz Foundation, which donated $1.5 million to Hawaiian Gardens, California, for the construction of the Fedde Middle School Sports Complex, the first state-of-the-art sports facility in the city. He donated to Karl Rove's American Crossroads, the Center for Security Policy and the Western Center for Journalism. The Irving Moskowitz Foundation donated $100,000 on March 17, 2011, to the American Red Cross for the 2011 Tōhoku earthquake and tsunami relief efforts. On June 26, 2013, The Irving Moskowitz Foundation donated $100,000 to the American Red Cross for Oklahoma relief efforts. On November 21, 2013, the Irving I. Moskowitz Foundation presented a check for $100,000 to the American Red Cross Long Beach Chapter to aid the victims of Typhoon Haiyan in the Philippines.
