= Old Yemenite Synagogue (Silwan) =

Synagogue in Jerusalem

- Location of the synagogue in Jerusalem

Religion
- Affiliation: Judaism
- Ecclesiastical or organisational status: Synagogue (1890–1936); Profane use (1935–2015); Synagogue (since 2015)
- Status: Active

Location
- Location: Silwan, East Jerusalem
- Country: State of Palestine
- Coordinates: 31°46′07″N 35°14′13″E

Architecture
- Completed: 1890; 2015 (restored)

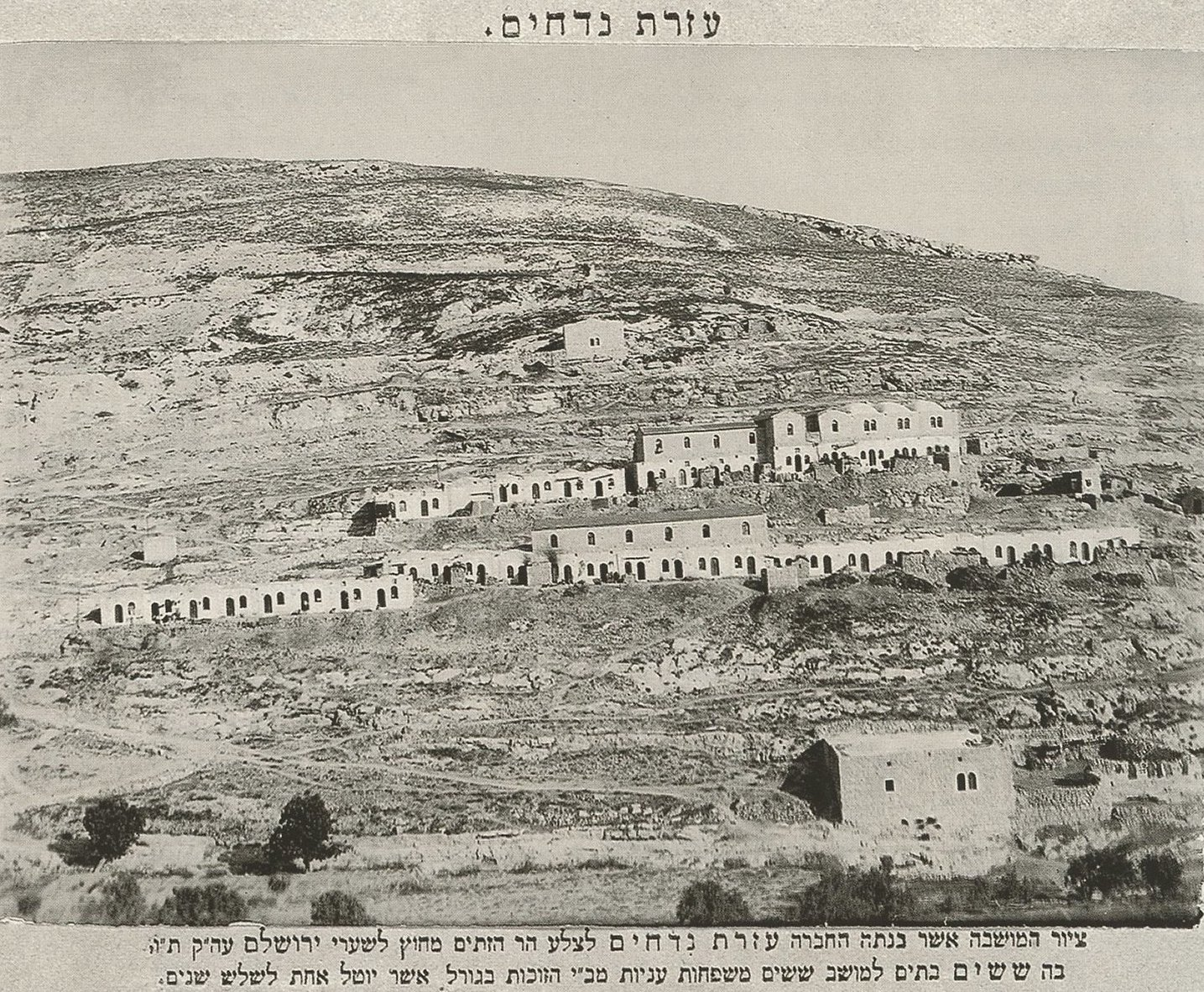
Yemenite-Jewish village south of Silwan, housing project built by a jewish charity in the 1880s (1891)

The Old Yemenite Synagogue, known to its congregation as Beit Knesset Ohel Shlomo (lit. "Solomon's Tent Synagogue"), is a Jewish congregation and restored synagogue, located in the Silwan district of East Jerusalem. The synagogue was constructed in the nineteenth century in the Yemenite Village (Harat al-Yaman in Arabic), in the Kfar Hashiloach (Hebrew: כפר השילוח) neighborhood.

== History ==
=== Jewish community in Silwan (1884-1938) ===
Between 1885 and 1891, 45 stone houses were built for the Yemenite Jews which had arrived in Jerusalem in 1882.

In 1936, during the 1936–39 Arab revolt in Palestine, the Yemenite-Jewish community was removed from Silwan by the Welfare Bureau of the Jerusalem Community Council (Va'ad ha-Kehillah), the local counterpart of the Jewish National Council (Va'ad Leumi), into the Jewish Quarter as security conditions for Jews worsened. and in 1938, the remaining Yemenite Jews in Silwan were evacuated by the Jewish Community Council on the advice of the police.

=== Jewish reclaim (2015) ===
In May 2015 Ateret Cohanim, a Jewish group that had established legal ownership of the old synagogue, moved into the building. Local residents threw rocks at the activists as they moved in.

== See also ==
- History of the Jews in Palestine
- List of synagogues in Palestine
- Synagogues of Jerusalem
