= Beit Orot =

Coordinates: 31°47′08″N 35°14′47″E

Beit Orot (Hebrew: בית אורות, lit. The House of Lights) is a Jewish neighborhood on the northern ridge on the Mount of Olives, in East Jerusalem, near the Augusta Victoria Hospital and the Palestinian neighbourhood of At-Tur.

The Irving Moskowitz Yeshiva & Campus, a Religious Zionist Hesder yeshiva is the nucleus of the neighborhood.

== History ==
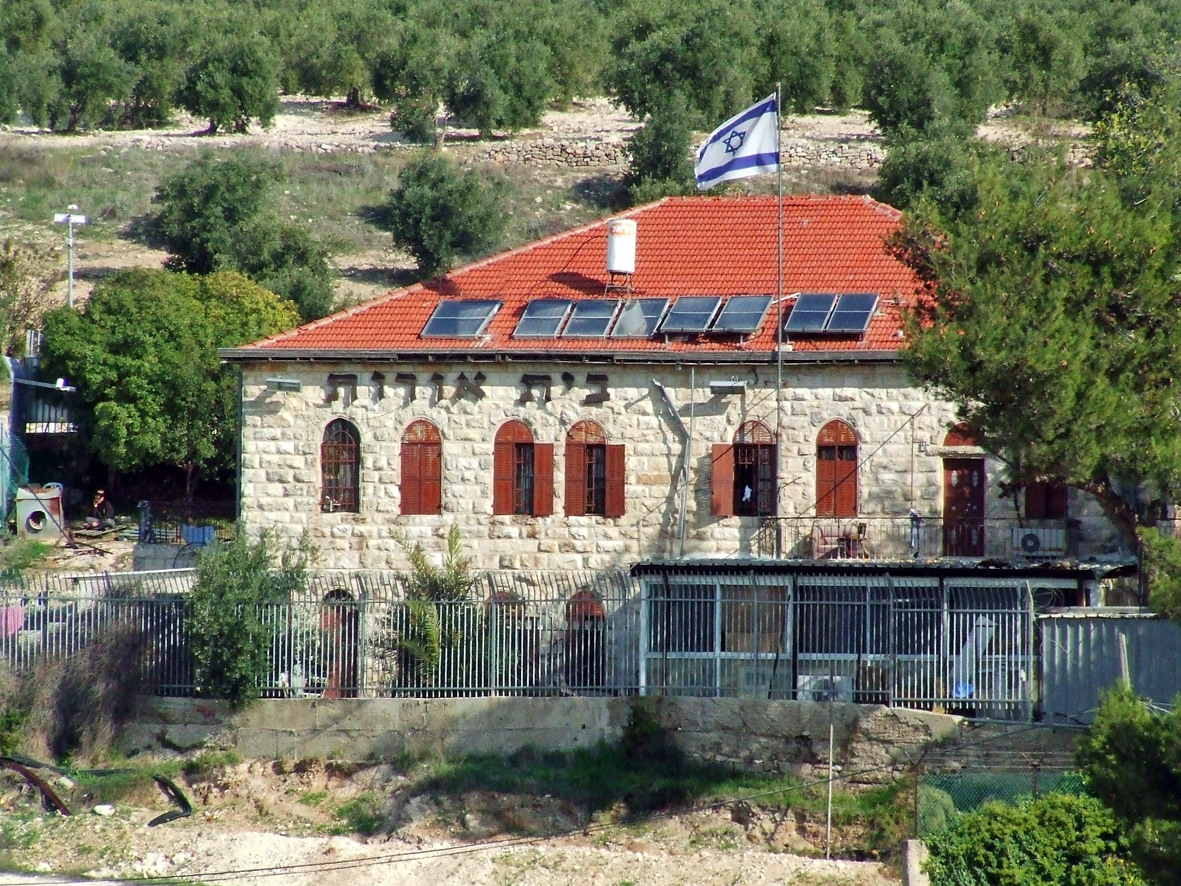
Irving Moskowitz Yeshiva in Beit Orot (2013)

The purchase of the land that was to become Beit Orot was arranged in 1990 by Hanan Porat, an Israeli politician, and financed by Dr. Irving Moskowitz, an American Jewish philanthropist, and his wife, Mrs. Cherna Moskowitz. The site was chosen for its historic significance: during the Six-Day War in 1967, Porat was a paratrooper and his commander, Giora Askenazi, was killed there in the fight for the Old City in Jerusalem. Porat founded Beit Orot together with Binyamin Elon.

The purchase was controversial, as the site of Beit Orot had originally been planned as an Arab school, and the purchase of the land for the yeshiva was opposed by then-mayor Teddy Kollek, but Kollek was soon voted out of office and the purchase allowed to be concluded. The project continues to stir controversy as Palestinian authorities decried continued Jewish building in what they say should be Arab neighborhoods.

On January 31, 2011, a cornerstone laying ceremony was held for four apartment buildings with a total of 24 homes that are the beginning of the new Jewish Israeli settlement of Beit Orot on the Mount of Olives Ridge. In attendance at the ceremony were Knesset members, Jerusalem city councilmen, former Republican presidential candidate Mike Huckabee, and actor Jon Voight.

== Jerusalem Day program ==
Beit Orot hosts a popular program for Jerusalem Day. Beit Orot's location overlooks a panoramic view of the entire city of Jerusalem, the Temple Mount and the Old City walls. As part of the Jerusalem Day program, there are multiple free guided tours of the Mount of Olives Ridge, the area of the 1967 battle. One tour follows the path that the paratroopers took to the Lion's Gate on their way to liberating Jerusalem.

== See also ==
- Ma'ale ha-Zeitim, another Jewish settlement on the Mount of Olives
