= Holy Synod of Jerusalem =

The Holy Synod of Jerusalem is the senior ruling body of the Greek Orthodox Patriarchate of Jerusalem and the Brotherhood of the Holy Sepulchre.

The synod consists of 18 members nominated by the Patriarch in a session of the Holy Synod itself. It normally consists of all of the bishops and several senior archimandrites (or younger archimandrites who are likely to be made bishops at some point).

During the interregnum between patriarchs it serves as the supreme body under the chairmanship of the locum tenens. The current president of the Holy Synod is Patriarch Theophilos III of Jerusalem.

== Election of Theophilos III ==
The synod was involved in the election of Theophilos III as Patriarch of the Greek Orthodox Church of Jerusalem on 22 August 2005. The synod consisted of 14 permanent members.

== See also ==
- Synod of Jerusalem
