= Greek Orthodox Patriarchate of Jerusalem =

Eastern Orthodox church

Greek Orthodox Church of Jerusalem Πατριαρχεῖον Ἱεροσολύμων بطريركية الروم الأرثوذكس في القدس

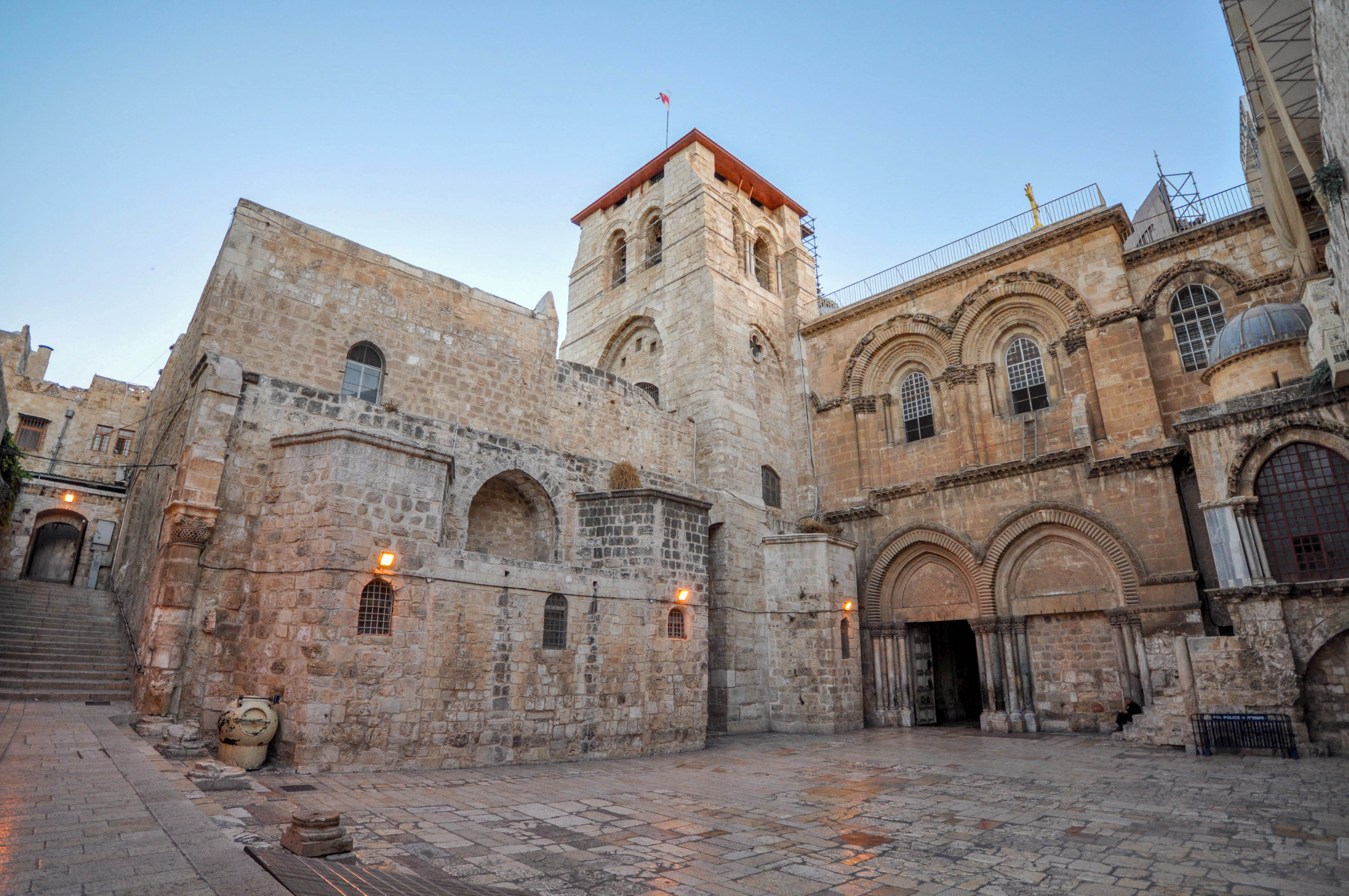
- Church of the Holy Sepulchre, headquarters of the Greek Orthodox Church of Jerusalem
- Classification: Christian
- Orientation: Greek Orthodox
- Scripture: Septuagint; New Testament
- Theology: Eastern Orthodox theology
- Polity: Episcopal polity
- Primate: Theophilos III
- Language: Greek, Arabic, English
- Liturgy: Byzantine Rite
- Headquarters: Church of the Holy Sepulchre, Jerusalem
- Territory: Israel; Jordan; Palestine
- Founder: The Apostles
- Origin: 1st century Jerusalem, Roman Empire
- Independence: AD 451 from the Metropolis of Caesarea
- Members: 200,000–500,000
- Official website: www.jerusalem-patriarchate.info

The Greek Orthodox Patriarchate of Jerusalem, (Note: Greek: Πατριαρχεῖον Ἱεροσολύμων, Patriarcheîon Hierosolýmōn; Arabic: بطريركية الروم الأرثوذكس في القدس, romanized: Baṭriyarkiyyat ar-Rūm al-ʾUrṯūḏuks fī 'l-Quds, lit. 'Patriarchate of the Rūm Orthodox in Jerusalem', Hebrew: הפטריארכיה היוונית-אורתודוקסית של ירושלים.) also known as the Greek Orthodox Church of Jerusalem, is an autocephalous Eastern Orthodox church in full communion with the other Eastern Orthodox churches. Established in the mid-fifth century as one of the oldest patriarchates in Christendom, it is headquartered in the Church of the Holy Sepulchre in Jerusalem and led by the patriarch of Jerusalem, currently Theophilos III. The patriarchate's ecclesiastical jurisdiction includes roughly 200,000 to 500,000 Orthodox Christians across the Holy Land in Palestine, Jordan and Israel.

The church traces its foundation in Jerusalem to the day of Pentecost, when the Holy Spirit, according to Christian beliefs, descended on the disciples of Jesus Christ and ushered the spread of the Gospel. The church celebrates its liturgy in the ancient Byzantine Rite – whose sacred language, Koine Greek, is the original language of the New Testament – and follows its own liturgical year under the Julian calendar. (Note: That is, thirteen days behind the Western (Gregorian) calendar.)

The majority of Orthodox Christians under the patriarchate are Palestinians and Jordanians, with minorities of Russians, Romanians, and Georgians. However, the church's hierarchy has been dominated by Greek clergy since its creation, which has been a source of recurring tension and dispute. A movement to Arabize the church, known as the Arab Orthodox Movement, began in the 19th century. The church serves as custodian of several holy places in Christianity, including the Church of the Nativity, in Bethlehem, where Jesus is said to have been born, and the Church of the Holy Sepulchre in Jerusalem, which includes the traditional site of Jesus' crucifixion and the empty tomb from which he is believed to have resurrected.

== History ==
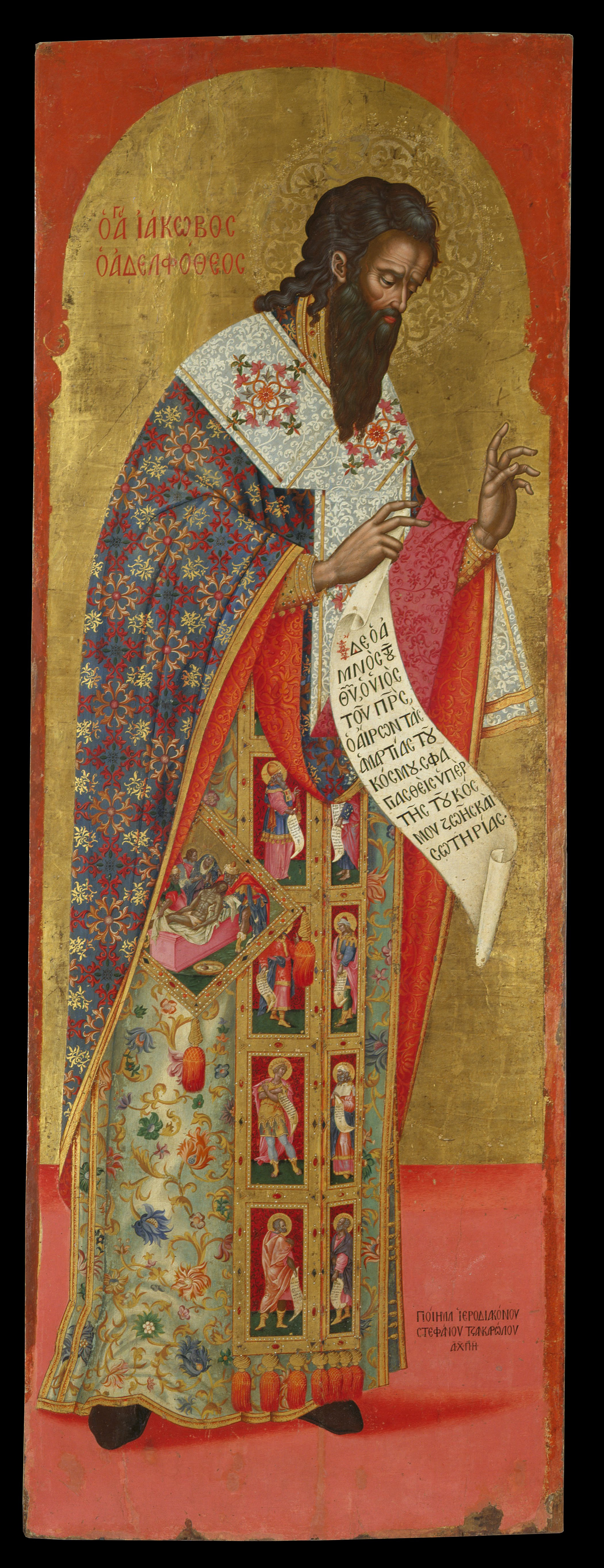
James, brother of Jesus, first Bishop of Jerusalem

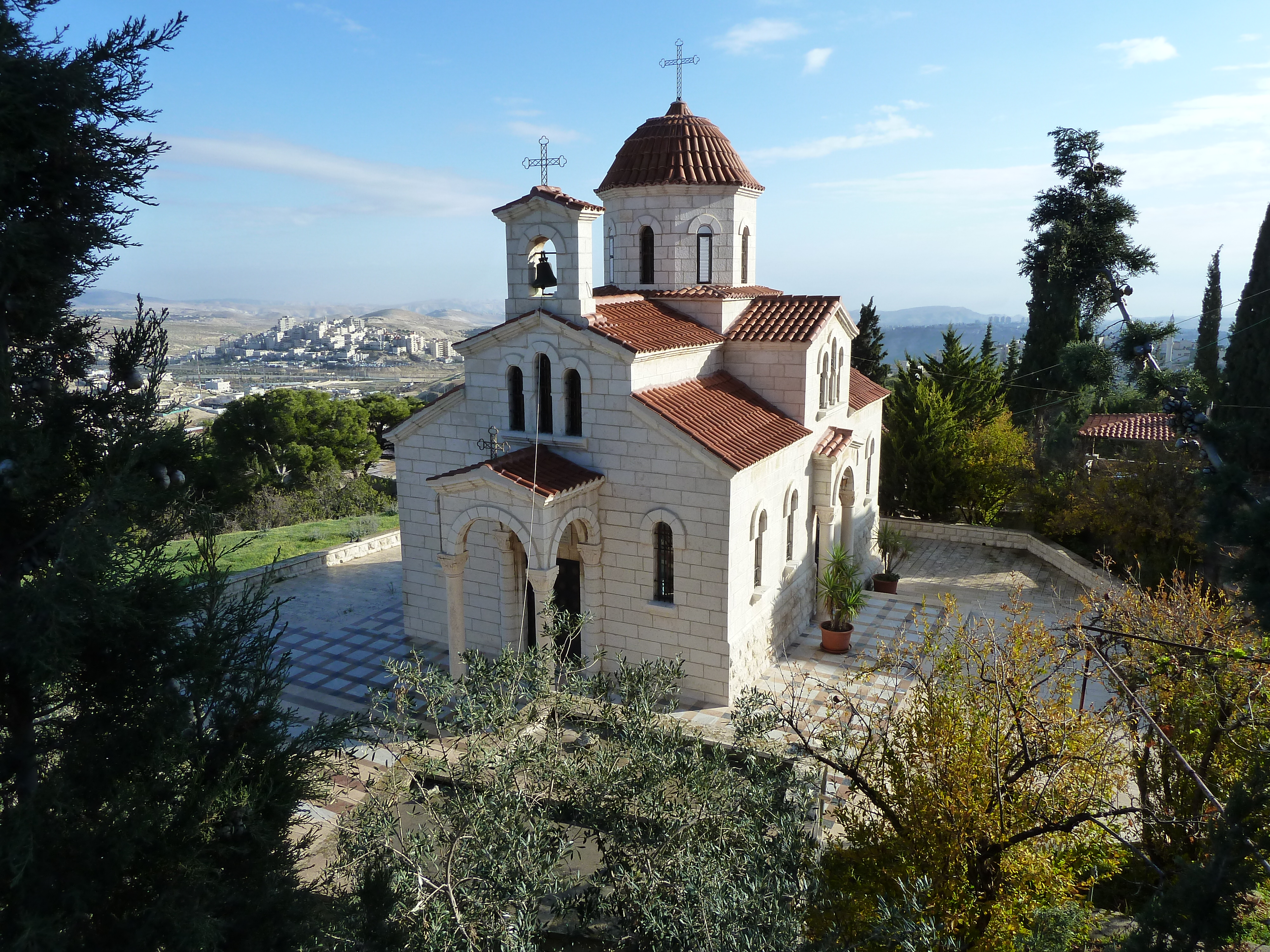
The Greek Orthodox Church of Bethphage on the Mount of Olives, Jerusalem

In the Apostolic Age, the early centers of Christianity consisted of an indefinite number of local churches that initially looked to Jerusalem as its main centre and point of reference. Some found their way to Antioch, where they undertook evangelical efforts, and to whom the term "Christians" was first used. Nevertheless, Jerusalem was consistently central to Christianity.

During the first Christian centuries the church at this place was the centre of Christianity in Jerusalem, "Holy and glorious Sion, mother of all churches." Certainly no spot in Christendom can be more venerable than the place of the Last Supper, which became the first Christian church.

Before the outbreak of the First Jewish–Roman War (66–73 AD) and the destruction of Herod's Temple in 70 by Titus, Christians led by Simeon fled to Pella in Decapolis (Jordan), where they remained until 135.

The Jews of Judea again revolted against Rome in the Bar Kokhba revolt (132–136). By or during that time, the Christians had returned to Jerusalem. However, to punish the Jews for their revolt and to prevent further unrest, Jerusalem was made a Roman colony and renamed Aelia Capitolina by Hadrian. In 135, the Metropolitan of Caesarea appointed Marcus as the first bishop of the renamed Church of Aelia Capitolina. He was the first gentile bishop of the Church of Jerusalem (or Aelia Capitolina), all the previous ones having been Jewish. The persecution of Jews by Roman authorities in Judea increased, with most of the Jewish and Christian population of Judea being enslaved and dispersed throughout the Roman Empire. The importance and place of Jerusalem in the life of the Christian Church diminished, though a Jewish and Christian remnant always remained in the city and the land.

Despite the strife, persecutions and meager population, bishops continued to be elected or named. Eusebius of Caesarea provides the names of an unbroken succession of thirty-six Bishops of Jerusalem up to the year 324. The first sixteen of these bishops were Jewish—from James the Just to Judas († 135)—and the remainder were Gentiles. The Metropolitans of Caesarea continued to appoint the bishops of Aelia Capitolina until 325.

At the First Council of Nicaea in 325, though the bishop of Aelia Capitolina was still subordinate to the Metropolitan of Caesarea, the council accorded the bishop a certain undefined precedence in its seventh canon.

In a decree issued from the seventh session of the Fourth Ecumenical Council (the Council of Chalcedon) in 451 the bishop of Jerusalem was elevated to the rank of patriarch, ranked fifth after the sees of Rome, Constantinople, Alexandria, and Antioch (see pentarchy). Since then, the Church of Jerusalem has remained an autocephalous church. Jerusalem was established as a patriarchate because of the holiness of the place; the special significance acquired between the first and fourth ecumenical councils; the erection of magnificent churches; the conversion of a large proportion of the population of Roman and Byzantine Syria-Palestina to Christianity; the coming together of pilgrims from around the world; the importance of outstanding bishops, monks, and teachers of the Church of Jerusalem; the struggles of the Brotherhood of the Holy Sepulchre on behalf of Orthodoxy; and the support of various emperors of Byzantium.

The Persians occupied Jerusalem in 614 and took Patriarch Zachariah prisoner, along with the palladium of Christianity, the Precious Cross. Chrysostomos Papadopoulos writes in his history of the patriarchate:

The Churches and the monasteries, inside and outside Jerusalem, were destroyed; the Christians were brutally slaughtered ... thousands of prisoners purchased by Jews were slaughtered. Anything good that existed was destroyed or was plundered by the invaders. The monks were slaughtered mercilessly, especially those of St. Savvas Monastery.

In 637, after a long siege of Jerusalem, Patriarch Sophronius surrendered Jerusalem to Caliph Umar, but secured the Covenant of Umar I, which recognised Christian rights to protection. In 638, the Armenian Apostolic Church began appointing its own bishop in Jerusalem.

After 638, however, Christians suffered many persecutions. Christian shrines were repeatedly ransacked and defaced by the successors of Umar, and there was great persecution all around. The most deadly persecution occurred during the time of the Fatamid Al-Hakim bi-Amr Allah (1007–1009), named the "Nero of Egypt" for his merciless acts. He persecuted ferociously both Christians and Jews, ordering that in public Jews were to wear masks representing the head of an ox and bells around their necks; Christians were to wear mourning apparel and crosses one yard in length. Al-Hakim is particularly notorious for ordering the destruction of the Church of the Holy Sepulchre and other holy sites to Christians and Jews. In the eleventh century, the Caliph Ali az-Zahir, under a treaty with Byzantium, permitted the reconstruction of the shrines.

In the Great Schism, the patriarch of Jerusalem sided with the patriarch of Constantinople and, together with the patriarchs of Antioch and Alexandria, broke communion with Rome.

In 1099, the crusaders captured Jerusalem, setting up the Kingdom of Jerusalem and establishing a Latin hierarchy under a Latin patriarch, and expelling the Orthodox patriarch. The Latin patriarch resided in Jerusalem from 1099 to 1187, while Greek patriarchs continued to be appointed, but resided in Constantinople. In 1187, the Crusaders were forced to flee Jerusalem, and the Orthodox patriarch returned to Jerusalem. The Catholic Church continued to appoint Latin patriarchs, though the office holder resided in Rome until 1847, when they were permitted to return to the Middle East by the Ottoman authorities.

During the 19th century, the Greek Orthodox Patriarchate of Jerusalem occupied a sensitive geopolitical position within the Ottoman Empire. As part of the millet system, the patriarch acted both as ecclesiastical head and as political representative of the Orthodox community before the state, which enabled the Church to accumulate extensive landholdings through a combination of private and religious endowment titles. Russian imperial patronage, particularly after the Crimean War, significantly enhanced the patriarchate's influence: Russian donations and the growing numbers of pilgrims supported land acquisitions, ecclesiastical construction, and agricultural estates across Palestine. These activities allowed the patriarchate to assert itself against rival Catholic and Protestant missions while also engaging in competition with local actors, including Zionist colonization initiatives in the Late Ottoman and British Mandate periods. Scholars note that the patriarchate's territorial strategies, such as the establishment of estates at sites like Caesarea, reflected an effort to restore its former prominence while navigating the shifting balance of power among the Ottomans, European states, and emerging nationalist movements.

The Brotherhood of the Holy Sepulchre, which is closely linked to the Orthodox Church of Jerusalem, remains the custodian of many of the Christian Holy places in the Holy Land, sometimes jointly with the Roman Catholic Church and the Oriental Churches (Egyptian, Syrian, Ethiopian and Armenian Orthodox Christians).

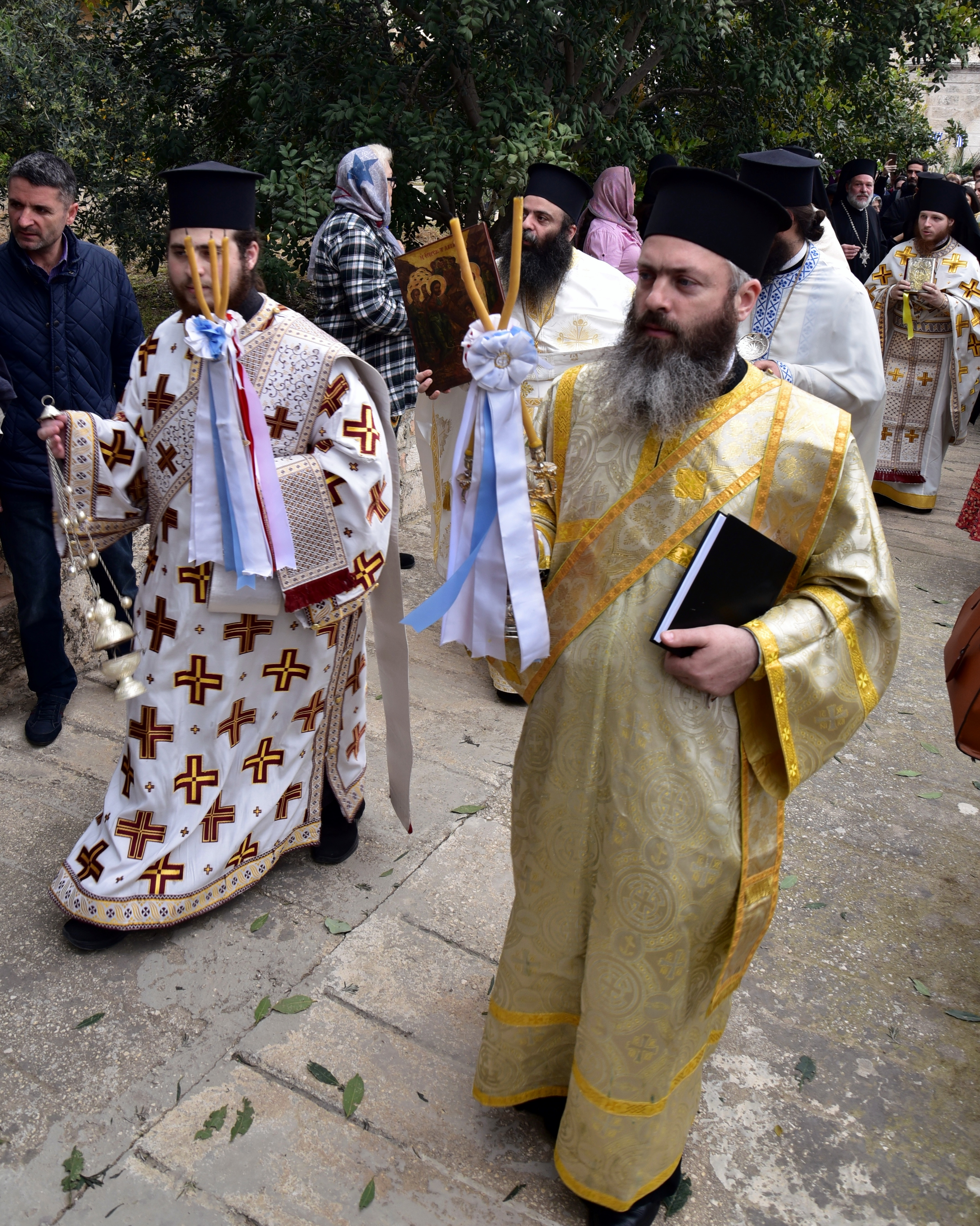
Lazarus Saturday at the Holy Monastery of Martha and Mary in Bethany, West Bank

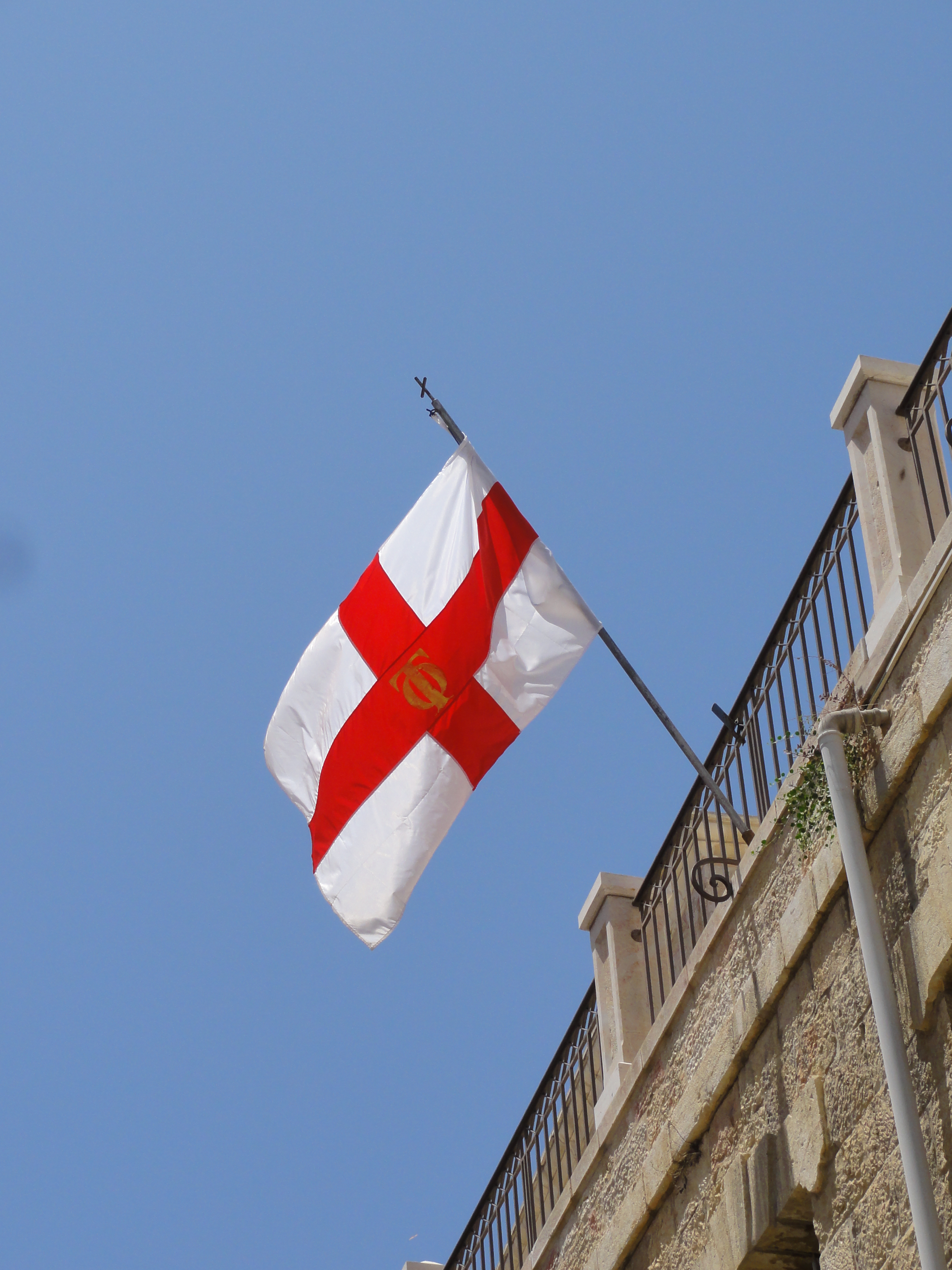
Flag of the Patriarchate with the letters "ΤΦ" (Tau + Phi) representing the word "taphos" (tomb or sepulchre)

=== Recent political controversies ===
Theophilos III became patriarch of the church at a very difficult time in its history. The politics of the Middle East and the delicacy of the relations with the Palestinian Authority, Israel and Jordan continued to make the role and place of the patriarch and the patriarchate very challenging.

In 2005, a crisis occurred in the church when Irenaios was deposed as patriarch by the Holy Synod of Jerusalem after having sold church property in East Jerusalem to Israeli investors. On August 22, 2005, the Holy Synod of the Church of Jerusalem unanimously elected Archbishop Theophilos of Tabor as the 141st patriarch of Jerusalem.

For some time the Israeli Government withheld recognition of Theophilos as the new patriarch, and continued to only recognize Irenaios as patriarch. This position has been criticised as defying the unanimous decision by representatives of all Eastern Orthodox churches meeting at the Phanar at the call of the ecumenical patriarch withdrawing communion from Irineos and recognizing Theophilos's canonical election.

Israel's refusal to recognise the patriarch's temporal role inhibited the patriarch's ability to take the Israeli government to court, and froze patriarchal bank accounts. This in turn threatened the maintenance of the Holy Places and the patriarchate school system with 40,000 students. It has been alleged that the origins of the dispute are part of a forty-year attempt by Israeli settler organizations and politicians to open up the patriarchate's extensive land holdings worth an estimated hundreds of millions of dollars.

In 2006, Israel refused to renew visas of many of the Greek clergy, which threatened to create a serious crisis within the church, as most of the monks are Greek citizens. Patriarch Theophilos appealed to the Israeli Supreme Court. A decision was due in mid-2006 and then in January 2007, but the Israeli government repeatedly requested further delays in the case. The Israeli newspaper Haaretz reported on 11 February 2007 that the Israeli government offered to recognize Theophilos if he would give up control of several valuable properties and sell church property only to Israelis.

In May 2007, the government of Jordan revoked its previous recognition of Theophilos III, but on 12 June 2007 the Jordanian cabinet reversed its decision and announced that it had once again officially recognised Theophilos as patriarch. Archbishop Theodosios (Hanna) of Sebastia has also called for a boycott of Theophilos.

In September 2017, hundreds of Palestinian Christians protested in Jerusalem calling for the removal of Theophilos III, accusing him of approving controversial land sales in East Jerusalem to Israeli settler organizations such as Ateret Cohanim. The patriarch denied wrongdoing and stated that the sales were made under legal pressure and did not compromise church property rights.

In December 2022, the patriarchate publicly condemned what it described as the illegal seizure of church land in the Silwan neighborhood of occupied East Jerusalem by Israeli settler groups, warning that such actions threatened the Christian presence in the Holy Land.

In August 2025, the patriarchate faced another financial and political crisis when Israeli authorities froze all of its bank accounts over a disputed Arnona (property tax) bill. Officials claimed that the church owed taxes on several income-generating properties, while the patriarchate argued that historic agreements exempted its holdings from such payments. The freeze disrupted the payment of salaries for clergy and staff and drew condemnation from the Palestinian Authority, Jordan, and other Christian institutions, which viewed the move as a violation of the traditional status quo protecting church property in Jerusalem. Following international advocacy efforts, the freeze on the patriarchate's bank accounts had been lifted by December 2025.

== Land holdings ==
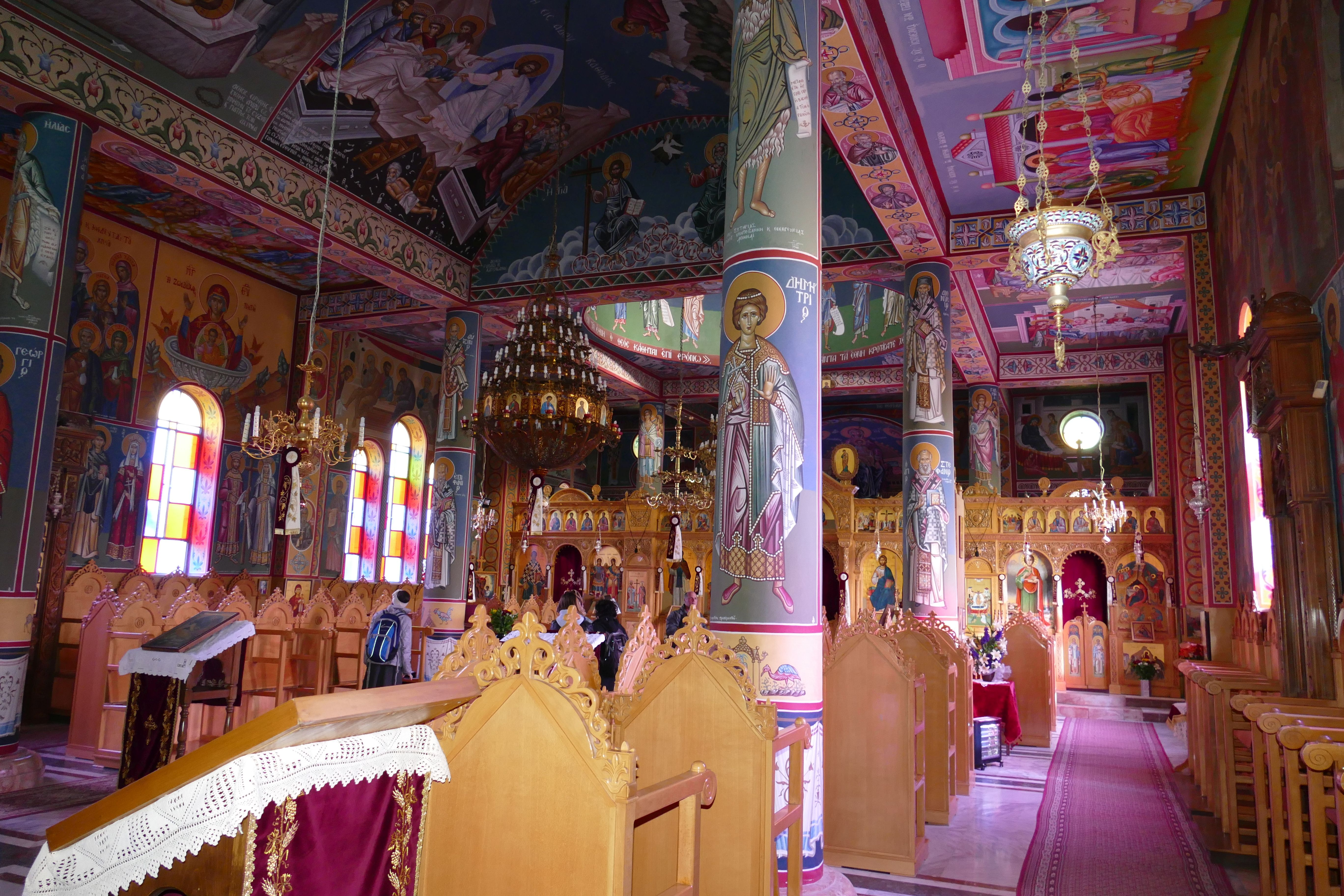
Interior of the Greek Orthodox Church of the Shepherds' Fields, Beit Sahour

The Greek Orthodox Patriarchate of Jerusalem is the second biggest owner of land in Israel, after only the Israeli government. The Greek Church purchased most of its lands from the Ottoman Empire during the 19th century. In the 1950s, shortly after Israel's independence, the Greek Patriarchate agreed to lease most of its lands in Israel to the Israeli government for 99 years, with an option to extend. Even Israel's parliament, the Knesset, was built on lands owned by the Greek Orthodox Church.

The Greek Orthodox Patriarchate's properties also include historic buildings in Jerusalem's Old City, including the Imperial and Petra hotels, inside the Jaffa Gate of the Old City, as well as extensive areas in the Palestinian territories.

In 2005, it was revealed that then patriarch Irenaios had sold lands owned by the Greek Orthodox Patriarchate in East Jerusalem to Jews who seek to increase their presence in what is a predominantly Arab area. The majority of Orthodox Christians in Jerusalem identify as Palestinian, and the sale of lands to Israelis caused a major uproar, which resulted in Irenaios being ousted as patriarch. Such land transactions are controversial since Palestinians see them as an effort for Jews to expand their presence in East Jerusalem. Many Palestinians aim for that part of Jerusalem to be the capital of a future state; meanwhile Israelis claim otherwise.

== Arab Orthodox Movement ==
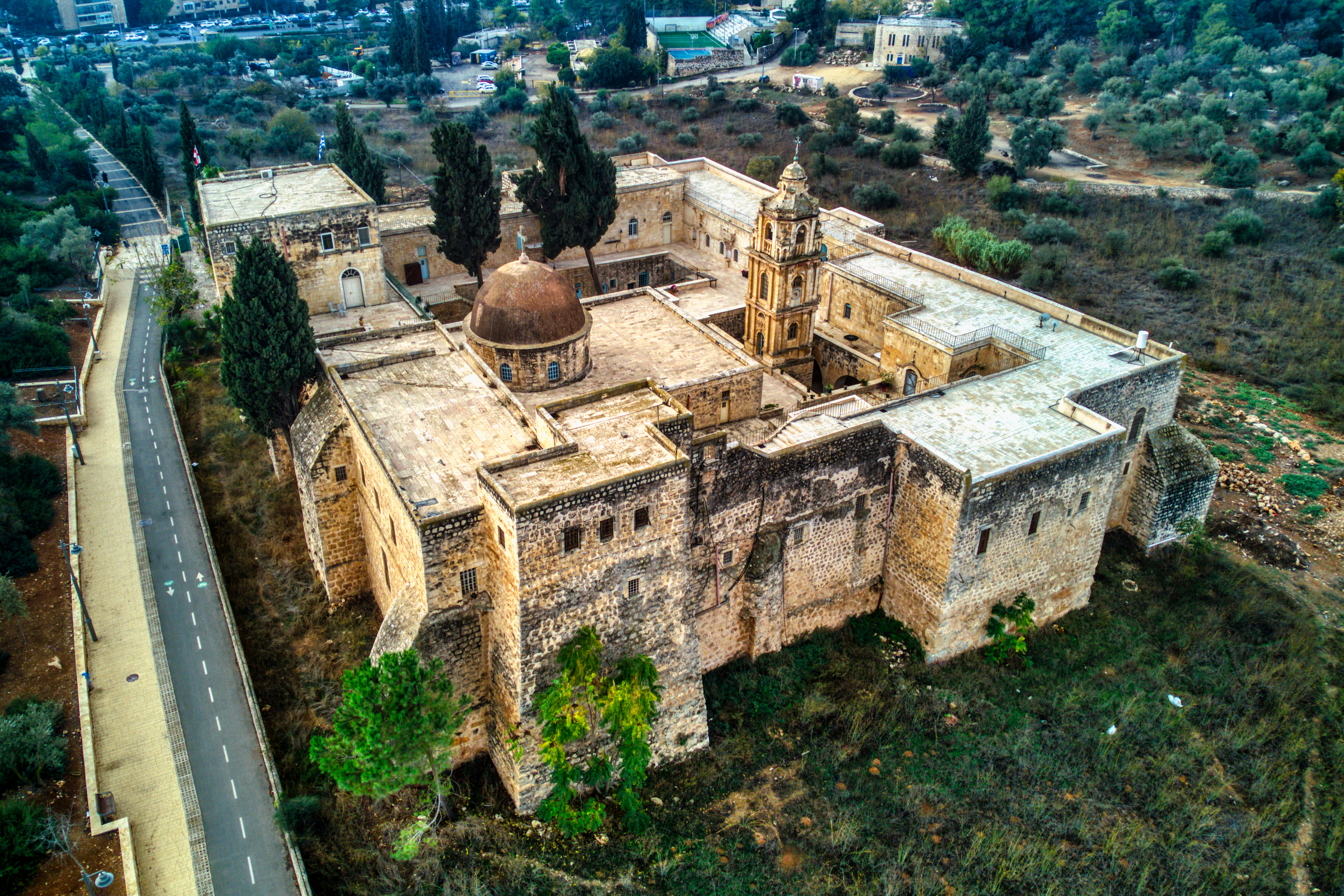
Monastery of the Cross

A political and social movement aiming for the Arabization of the Greek Orthodox Patriarchate of Jerusalem, known as the Arab Orthodox Movement, started in the 19th century.

The movement began within the context of rising Arab nationalism, inspired by 19th-century nationalist movements in the Balkans, which merged demands for religious reforms and national emancipation under the Ottoman Empire, and the successful Arabization of Syria and Lebanon's Antioch Patriarchate in 1899. It demands the appointment of an Arab patriarch, Arab laity control over Jerusalem patriarchate's properties for social and educational purposes, and the use of Arabic as a liturgical language. Initially a church movement among Palestine and Transjordan's Orthodox Arab Christians, it was later supported as a Palestinian and Arab nationalist cause and championed by Arab Muslims, owing to the Greek-dominated patriarchate's early support to Zionism.

The Arab Orthodox laity maintains that the patriarchate was forcibly Hellenized in 1543, while the Greek clergy counters by saying that the patriarchate was historically Greek. Opposition to the Greek clergy started violent in the 19th century, when they came under physical attack by the Arab laity in the streets. There were historically also several interventions to solve the conflict by the Ottoman, British (1921–1948), and Jordanian (1948–1967) authorities, owing to the patriarchate's headquarters being located in East Jerusalem. Despite the city coming under Israeli occupation since 1967, the patriarchate has continued to function according to a 1958 Jordanian law, which mandates the clergy hold Jordanian citizenship and speak Arabic.

To this day, the patriarchate continues to be dominated by Greek clergy, and continues to own vast properties that make it the second largest landowner in Israel. In recent decades, lawsuits have ensued in Israeli courts between the Arab laity and the patriarchate over ownership of properties, and land sales by the patriarchate to Israeli investors has led to several controversies, the most recent of which led to the dismissal of Patriarch Irenaios in 2005. The patriarch's total control over the patriarchate and its vast properties has led to it being described as resembling a "small absolute kingdom".

== Administration ==
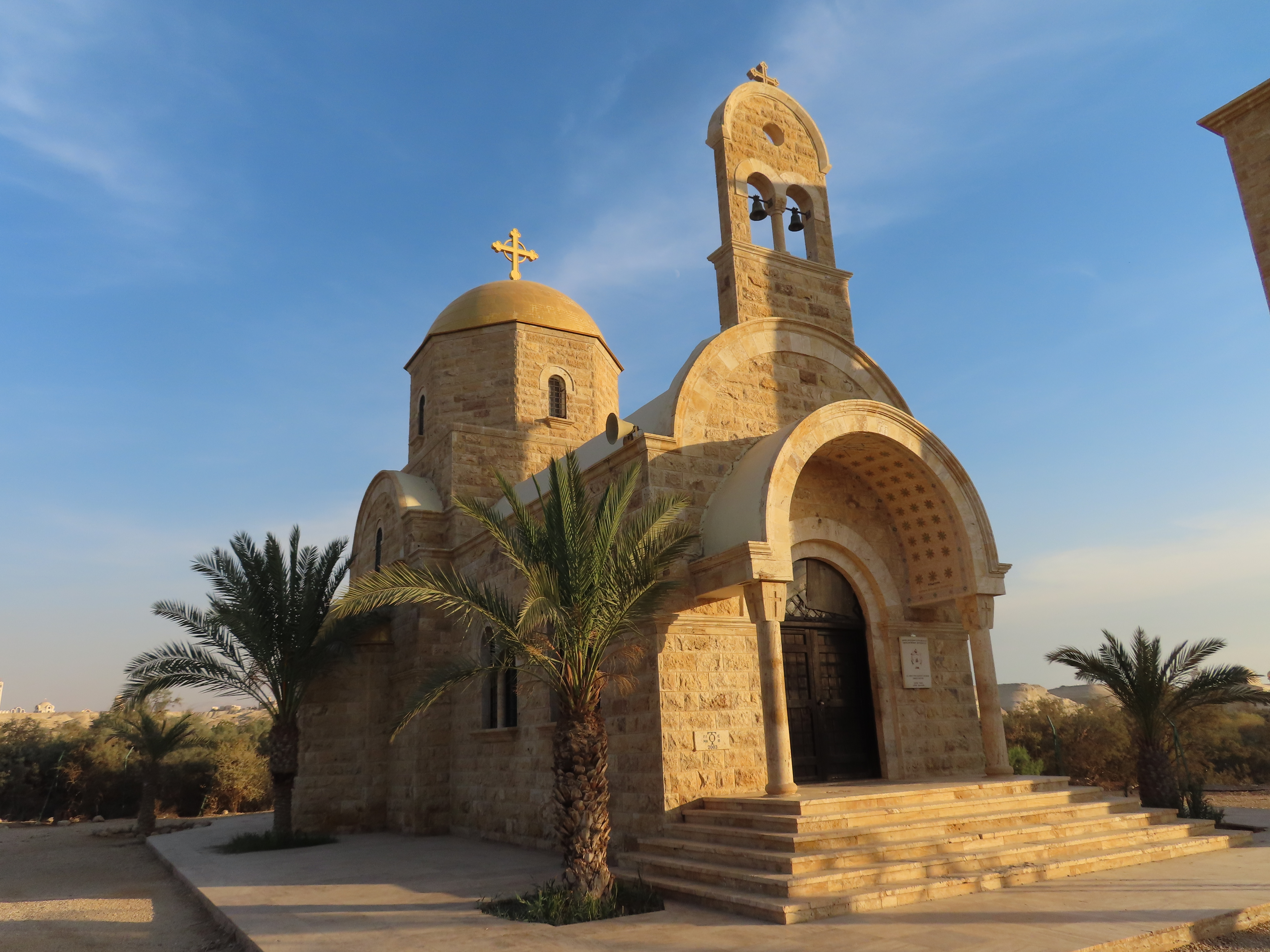
The Greek Orthodox Church of St. John the Baptist at Al-Maghtas, Jordan.

The head of the patriarchate and of the Holy Synod is Patriarch Theophilos III (Ilias Giannopoulos), Patriarch of the Holy City of Jerusalem and all Palestine, Israel, Syria, beyond the Jordan River, Cana of Galilee and Holy Zion.

=== Archdioceses and archbishops ===
- Archdiocese of Gerason: Theophanes (Theodosios) Hasapakis (1992–)
- Archdiocese of Tiberias: Alexios Moschonas (1996–)
- Archdiocese of Abila: Dorotheos (Demetrios) Leovaris (2000–)
- Archdiocese of Ioppe: Damaskinos (Anastasios) Gaganiaras (2000–)
- Archdiocese of Constantina: Aristarchos (Antonios) Peristeris (1998–)
- Archdiocese of Mount Thabor: Methodios (Nikolaos) Liveris (2005–)
- Archdiocese of Kyriakoupolis: Christophoros (2018–)
- Archdiocese of Sebastia: Theodosios (Nizar) Hanna (2005–)
- Archdiocese of Askalon: Nicephoros (2006–)
- Archdiocese of Diocaesarea: Vacancy
- Archdiocese of Madaba: Aristovoulos Kyriazis (2018–)
- Archdiocese of Qatar: Makarios of Qatar (2013–)

=== Metropolises and metropolitans ===
- Metropolis of Caesarea and Exarchate of Palaestina Prima: Vacancy
- Metropolis of Scythopolis: Vacancy
- Metropolis of Petra and Exarchate of Arabia Petraea: Cornelios (Emmanuel) Rodousakis (2005–)
- Metropolis of Ptolemais: Vacancy
- Metropolis of Nazareth and Exarchate of All the Galilee: Kyriakos (Andreas) Georgopetris (1991–)
- Metropolis of Neapolis: Vacancy
- Metropolis of Capitolias: Isykhios (Elias) Condogiannis (1991–)
- Metropolis of Bostra: Timotheos (Theodoros) Margaritis (1998–)
- Metropolis of Eleutheropolis: Vacancy
- Metropolis of Philadelphia: Benediktos (George) Tsekouras (2001–)

=== Autonomous churches ===
- Orthodox Church of Mount Sinai (Archdiocese of Mount Sinai, Pharan and Raithu)

== See also ==
- Christianity in the Middle East
- Limits of the Five Patriarchates
- Arab Orthodox Movement
- Palestinian Christians
- Eastern Orthodoxy in Jordan
- Christian Palestinian Aramaic
