= Patriarch Theophilos III of Jerusalem =

Patriarch of Jerusalem

His Most Godly Beatitude Theophilos III OR OGE
- Patriarch of Jerusalem and All Palestine
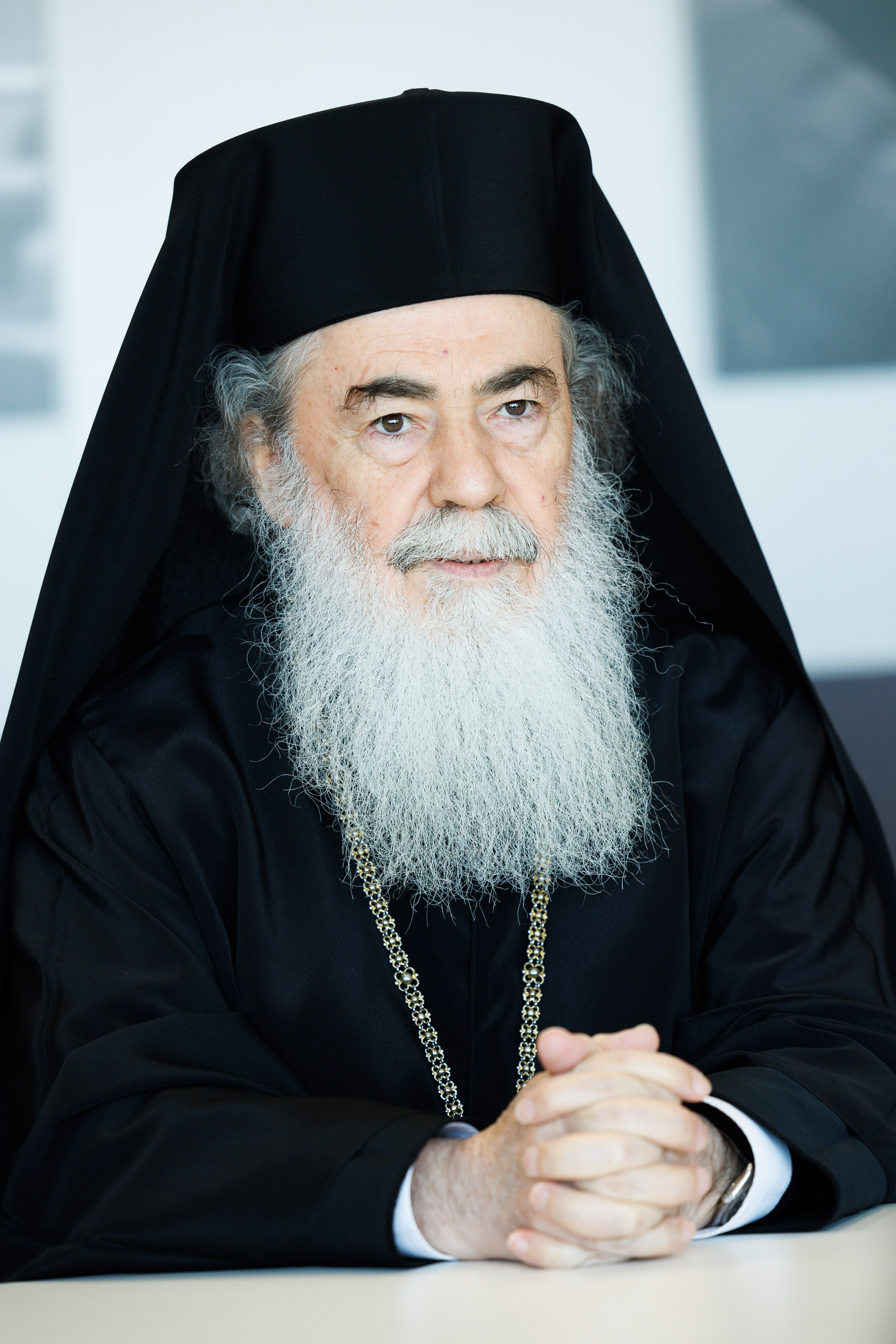
- Theophilos III in 2023
- Church: Greek Orthodox Church of Jerusalem
- See: Jerusalem
- Installed: November 22, 2005
- Predecessor: Irenaios

Personal details
- Born: Ilias Giannopoulos; 4 April 1952 (age 74) Gargalianoi, Messenia, Greece
- Residence: Jerusalem
- Education: University College, Durham; Hebrew University of Jerusalem; University of Athens
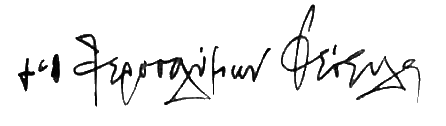
- Signature

Theophilos III (Greek: Πατριάρχης Ιεροσολύμων Θεόφιλος Γ'; Arabic: غبطة بطريرك المدينة المقدسة اورشليم وسائر أعمال فلسطين كيريوس كيريوس ثيوفيلوس الثالث, romanized: Ghabṭat baṭrīark al-madīnat al-muqaddasa Urshālim wa sā'ir A'māl Filasṭīn Kiryūs Kiryūs Thiyūfīlūs al-thālith; born 4 April 1952) is the current Greek Orthodox patriarch of Jerusalem since 2005. He is styled Patriarch of the Holy City of Jerusalem and all Palestine, Syria, Arabia, beyond the Jordan River, Cana of Galilee, and Holy Zion.

Theophilos (also spelled Theofilos or Theophilus) was elected unanimously on 22 August 2005 by the Holy Synod of Jerusalem as the 141st primate of the Orthodox Church of Jerusalem, succeeding the deposed Irenaios. His election was confirmed by the Eastern Orthodox synod of Constantinople, and was endorsed by Jordan on 24 September 2005, and subsequently by the Palestinian Authority. He was enthroned on 22 November 2005, despite initial Israeli objections. The Israeli government officially recognized Theophilos' election on 16 December 2007. Theophilos was previously the Archbishop of Tabor.

== Biography ==
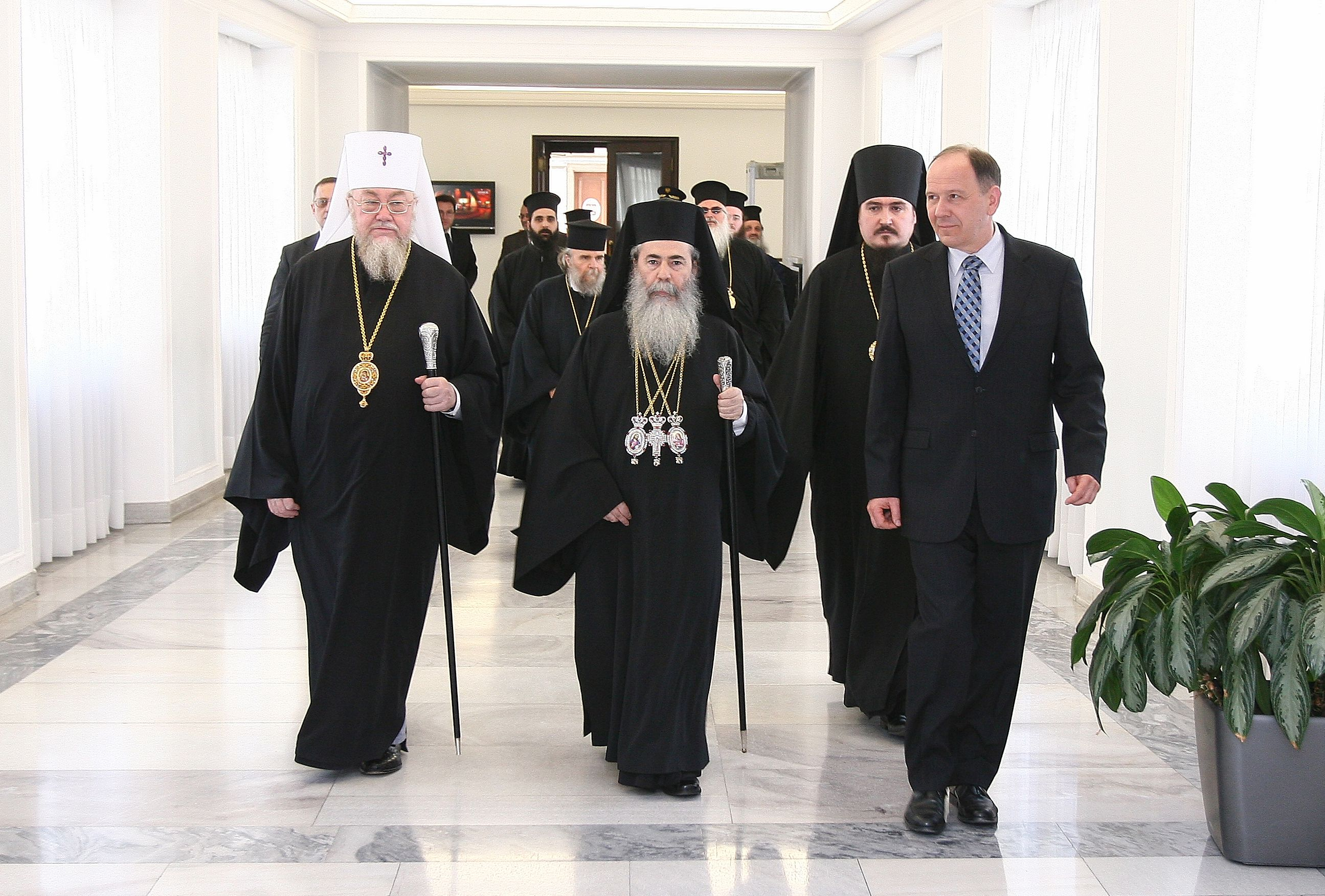
Patriarch Theophilos III of Jerusalem in the Senate of the Republic of Poland (2010)

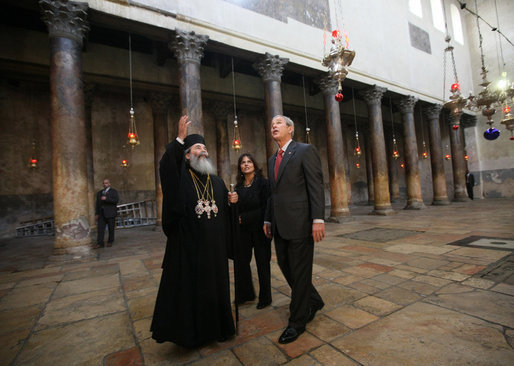
U.S. President George W. Bush listens as Theophilos III speaks during a visit to the Church of the Nativity, Bethlehem, 10 January 2008.

Theophilos was born Ilias Giannopoulos (Ηλίας Γιαννόπουλος, إلياس يانوبولوس) in Gargalianoi, Messenia, Greece, on 4 April 1952 to parents Panagiotes and Triseugenia. In 1964, Ilias moved to Jerusalem.

He served as archdeacon for then-patriarch Benedict I of Jerusalem. From 1991 to 1996, he was a priest in Kafr Kanna in Galilee, which had a predominantly Palestinian Christian community, there he also formed a brotherhood called "Nour al Masih" ("Light of Christ"), to spread the Orthodox Christian faith throughout the region; the group is still active and runs a website under the domain www.lightchrist.org.

Theophilos studied theology at the University of Athens. He went on to complete an MA from Durham University, graduating in 1984 as a member of Castle. He has also studied at the Hebrew University of Jerusalem. Besides his native Greek, he also speaks English, Arabic and Hebrew.

In 1996, he was one of the first Christian clergymen to go work in Qatar, where many Palestinian immigrant workers live today, a considerable number of them Orthodox Christians. He subsequently served as Exarch of the Holy Sepulchre in Qatar.

From 2000 to 2003, he was church envoy to the Patriarchate of Moscow.

In February 2005, he was consecrated Archbishop of Tabor.

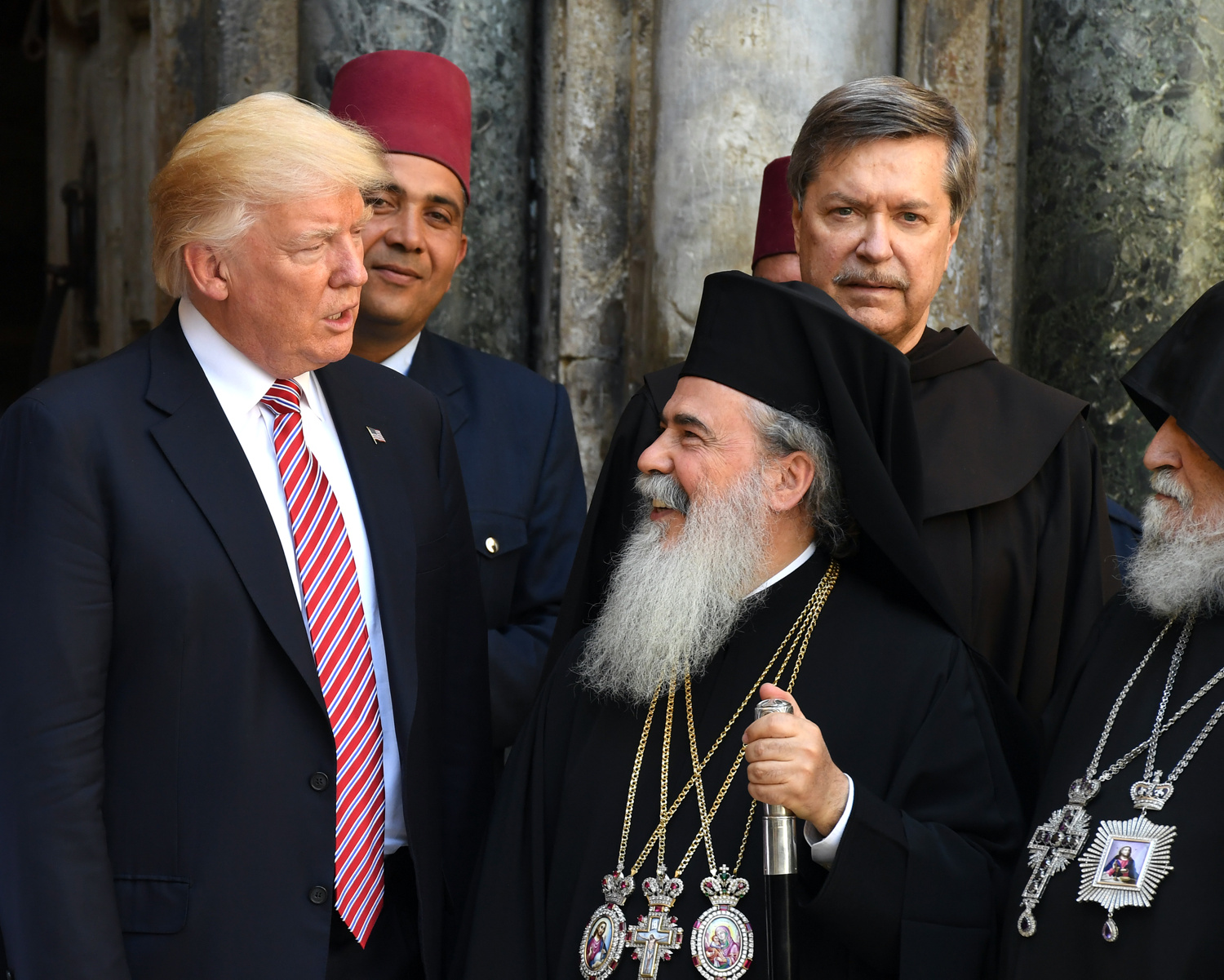
Patriarch Theophilos III with the American President Donald Trump, in 2017

He was officially enthroned as Patriarch of Jerusalem and All Palestine on November 22, 2005. Delegates from all of the Orthodox Churches as well as high secular dignitaries were in attendance, including the President of Greece, and senior officials representing the governments of Palestine, Jordan and Qatar, as well as diplomats and military officials.

Patriarch Theophilos has so far refused to concelebrate with any representatives from the newly established Orthodox Church of Ukraine which he considered a schismatic church.

On June 4, 2026, Theophilos awarded US President Donald Trump with the Grand Cross of the Order of the Holy Sepulchre.

== See also ==
- Palestinian Christians
- Patriarch of Jerusalem
- List of Durham University people

Preceded by Irenaios I	Eastern Orthodox Patriarch of Jerusalem; 2005–present	Incumbent
