= Sheikh Jarrah controversy =

Political and legal dispute between Israel and the Palestinians

OCHA map of Palestinian communities under threat of eviction in East Jerusalem, as at 2016. Three areas of Sheikh Jarrah are identified: Im Haroun, Karm al-Jaouni and central Sheikh Jarrah.

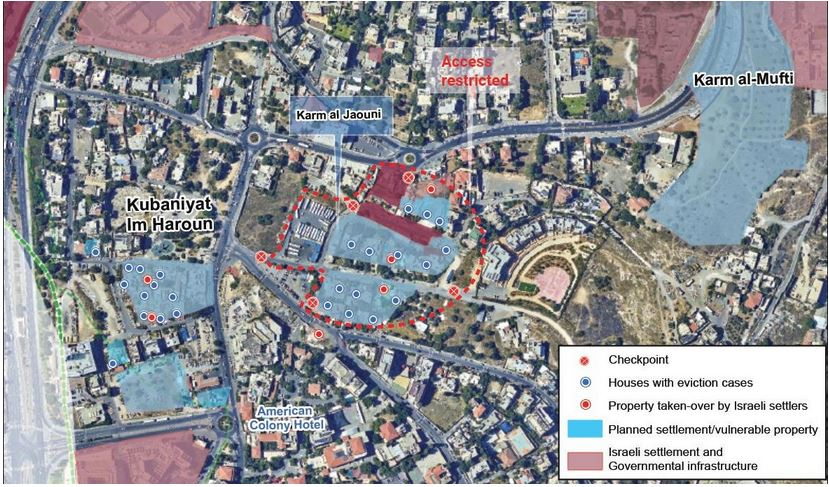
Checkpoints since 3 May 2021 at Karm Al Jaouni area of Sheikh Jarrah

The Sheikh Jarrah controversy, which has been described as a "property/real estate dispute" by the Israeli government and its supporters, and as an "expulsion", "displacement" or "ethnic cleansing" event and a matter of international law by Palestinians and their supporters, is a long-running legal and political dispute between Palestinians and Israelis over the ownership of certain properties and housing units in Sheikh Jarrah, East Jerusalem. The evictions are considered a contributory cause of the 2021 Israel–Palestine crisis.

It has been described as a microcosm of the Israeli–Palestinian disputes over land since 1948, with academic Kristen Alff noting "To describe dispossessions in Sheikh Jarrah as a "real estate" quarrel conceals the true history of land ownership in the regions – which is complicated, disputed and rarely decided in favor of Palestinians." In East Jerusalem, Israel's laws allow Jews to file claims over property held prior to 1948, but reject Palestinian claims over property that they owned prior to 1948 in Israel proper. According to Middle East Eye, the dispute is part of the Israeli government's Holy Basin settlement strategy. Aryeh King, a deputy mayor of Jerusalem and one of the founders of Ma'ale HaZeitim, an illegal settlement, told The New York Times that the eviction of Palestinian families was "of course" part of a municipal strategy to create "layers of Jews" throughout East Jerusalem. Many Palestinian families in East Jerusalem have been affected by "forced relocation processes or been involved in lengthy legal procedures to revoke an eviction order".

The property in Sheikh Jarrah in dispute includes the adjacent Shimon HaTzadik/Karm Al-Ja’ouni and Um Haroun (former Nahalat Shimon) compounds to the East and West respectively of the Nablus Road. In the former, the Palestinian residents of Sheikh Jarrah were refugees who received plots of land in a UNRWA lottery, relinquishing in return their refugee documents and accompanying rights. They have no right under Israeli law to repossess their pre-1948 homes in Haifa, Sarafand and Jaffa. The Palestinian view is that given Sheikh Jarrah's location beyond the Green Line or Israel proper, Israeli courts have no jurisdiction over land disputes in what is occupied territory according to international law, and that the displacement of people in occupied territory is a war crime under the Rome Statute. The United Nations Human Rights Office has said that as Sheikh Jarrah is in East Jerusalem, which is considered occupied territory, international humanitarian law prohibits the confiscation of private property and evictions of Palestinian families could constitute war crimes.

== Background ==
In 1876, during the Ottoman Era, the Sephardi Community Council and the Ashkenazi General Council of the Congregation of Israel jointly purchased land that included the Tomb of Simeon the Just and the Cave of the Minor Sanhedrin. The property was registered with the Ottoman authorities in the name of Rabbi Avraham Ashkenazi, for the Sephardic Jews, and Rabbi Meir Auerbach, for the Ashkenazi Jews. The cave tomb of Simeon the Just (or Shimon HaTzadik) was traditionally thought to be the burial of a noted Jewish high priest. According to scholarly consensus, based on an in situ inscription, it is actually the 2nd-century CE burial site of a Roman matron named Julia Sabina.

In 1890 the cornerstone was laid for the construction of a neighborhood called Shimon HaTzadik in the portion belonging to the Sephardic community, east of Nablus Road. In 1891 construction of Nahalat Shimon began to the west of Nablus Road.

Some Palestinians have disputed prior Jewish ownership and have produced Ottoman-era land titles for part of the land. An Israeli court has stated that the document of Jewish ownership was authentic and the Arab documents forged.

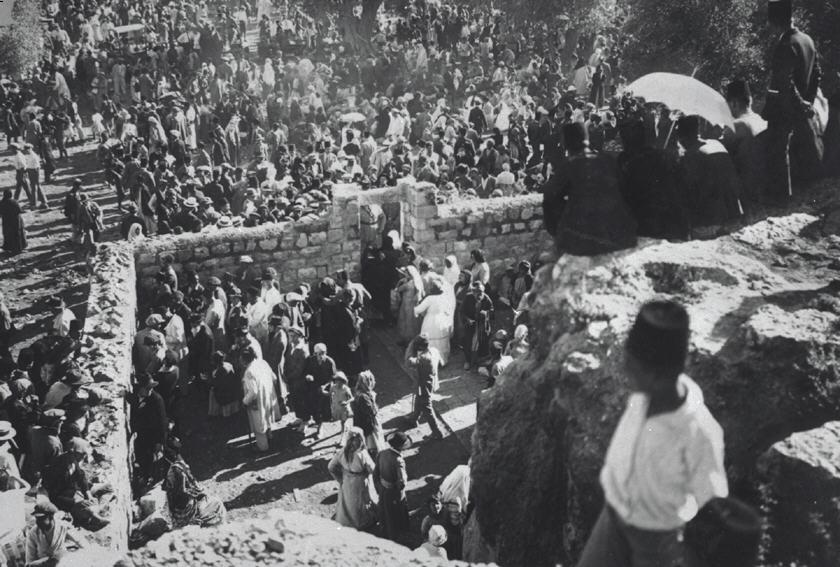
Jews in Nahalat Shimon on their way to the Tomb of Simeon the Just, 1927

In 1947, there were about 100 Jewish houses in the neighborhood. East Jerusalem came under Jordanian rule following the 1948 War. The evacuated Jewish residents were resettled in Palestinian homes in West Jerusalem.

The Ashkenazi portion of the property south of the tomb remained open space, and in 1956, 28 housing units for Palestinian refugees were constructed there. The Jordanian government agreed with the United Nations Palestinian relief agency UNRWA to house 28 Palestinian refugee families. These Palestinian families had previously lived in Haifa and Jaffa but had been displaced in 1948.

In 1948, approximately 750,000 Palestinians were displaced from their homes, and about 400 Palestinian towns and villages were depopulated, in areas which fell under Israeli control. In West Jerusalem the overwhelming mass of the wealthy Palestinian community, some 28,000, of which only roughly 750 (mostly Greeks and Christians) were permitted to remain, fled or were expelled; and their property was ransacked, subsequently confiscated and distributed to Jews. In the same period, during the 1948 War, the residents of the Jewish residents at Shimon HaTzadik and Nahalat Shimon were evacuated after the Jewish Haganah militia, later seconded by the British authorities, asked them to do so for security reasons. Altogether more than 10,000 Jews, including 2000 civilians from the Old City, were forced to leave their homes in Arab-controlled areas and relocate to areas within the Israeli side of the armistice line. According to one of the evacuees, Justice Emeritus Michael Ben-Yair, all these Jewish evacuees from Sheikh Jarrah were given Palestinian homes in West Jerusalem in compensation. 10,000 mostly fully-furnished Palestinian homes in the western sector of Jerusalem alone were occupied, and their original owners and Palestinians with property in other parts of Mandatory Palestine and what later became Israel are denied the right to reclaim their property.

In a 1987 court decision, the two Jewish trusts who had bought the land in 1876 were recognized as owner of that land, but the Palestinians living there were defined as protected tenants.

In 1993 the two Jewish trusts began filing suits for payment of rental fees. In 2001 the Jerusalem Court accepted the trusts’ demand to evict tenants for non-payment of rent.

== Timeline of evictions ==
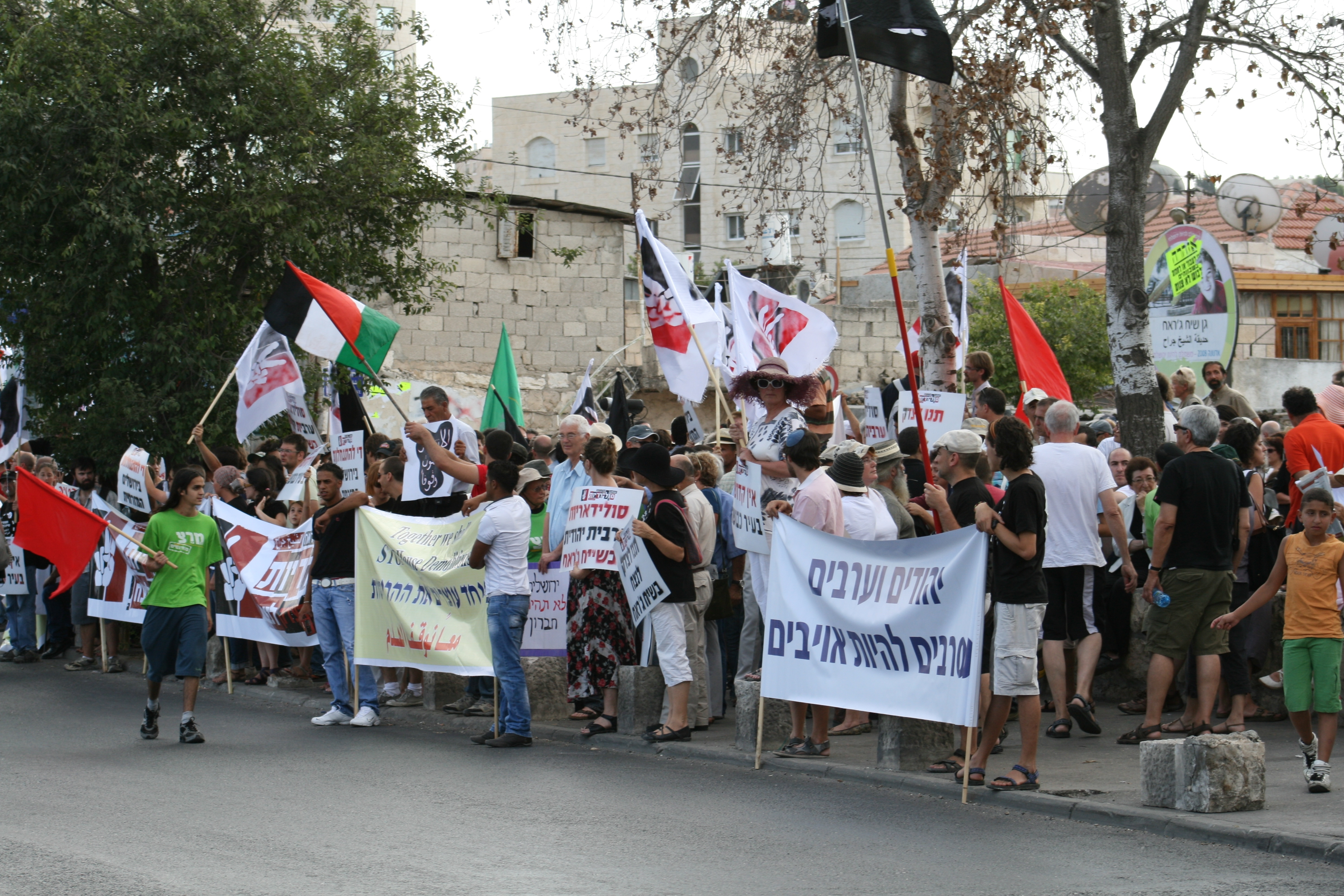
Sheikh Jarrah demonstration against eviction of Palestinian families, August 2010

=== Karm Al-Ja’ouni (Shimon HaTzadik) ===
In 2001, Israeli settlers moved into a sealed section of the al-Kurd family's house in the compound of Shimon HaTzadik and refused to leave, claiming the property was owned by Jews. The dispute was heard by the Jerusalem District Court, which ruled in 2008 that the property belonged to the Sephardi Community Committee. The committee transferred the property to a settler organization called "Shimon's Estate". The court also ruled that the Arab families would have protected tenant status as long as they paid rent. However, the al-Kurds refused to pay rent to the settler association, leading to their eviction in November 2008.

The court ruling was based on an Ottoman-era bill of sale. Lawyers for the Jewish families argued that documents from the Ottoman Empire originally used to prove that a Jewish Sephardic organization had purchased the land in question in the 19th century are indeed valid. However, in 2009, after the court hearing had been finalised, the authenticity of these documents was challenged on the basis that the building had only been rented to the Sephardi group. The lawyers for the Palestinians produced documents from Istanbul's Ottoman archives purporting to show that the Jewish organization that claims to own the land only rented it, and as such was not the rightful owner. The al-Kurd family claims that when they pressed the court to look at the new evidence, they were told "it's too late". Moreover, the Palestinian families and their supporters maintained that Ottoman documents that Israel's Supreme Court had validated were in fact forgeries, and that the original ruling and therefore evictions relating to that ruling should be reversed. The lawyer for the Israeli families emphasized that the land deeds were authentic, according to many Israeli courts. The Israeli court decision (resulting in the aforementioned evictions) stated that the document presented by the Palestinian families was a forgery, while the document of Jewish ownership was authentic.

43 Palestinians were evicted in 2002, the Hanoun and Ghawi families in 2008, and the Shamasneh family in 2017. In 2010, the Supreme Court of Israel rejected an appeal by Palestinian families who had lived in 57 housing units who had petitioned the court to have their ownership to the properties recognized. These petitioners refused to pay rent to the recognised owners and carried out construction on the properties unauthorized by those who the courts had recognized as the owners, and were evicted.

In August 2009, the al-Hanoun and al-Ghawi families were evicted from two homes in Sheikh Jarrah and Jewish families moved in after a Supreme Court ruling that the property was owned by Jews. The United Nations coordinator for the Middle East Peace Process, Robert Serry condemned the decision: "These actions heighten tensions and undermine international efforts to create conditions for fruitful negotiations to achieve peace." The US State Department called it a violation of Israel's obligations under the Road map for peace. Palestinian negotiator Saeb Erekat said "Tonight, while these new settlers from abroad will be accommodating themselves and their belongings in these Palestinian houses, 19 newly homeless children will have nowhere to sleep." Yakir Segev of the Jerusalem municipal council responded: "This is a matter of the court. It is a civil dispute between Palestinian families and those of Israeli settlers, regarding who is the rightful owner of this property... Israeli law is the only law we are obliged to obey."

The Palestinian families being evicted from Sheikh Jarrah owned property inside Israel (inside the Green Line), including in West Jerusalem, before 1948. Their properties were transferred to Israel under its Absentee Property Law. Palestinian families have offered to leave Sheikh Jarrah if they could get their pre-1948 property back. Conversely, one evicted Palestinian offered his home in Sarafand, Israel, in exchange for acquiring ownership of his home in Sheikh Jarrah; he did not receive a response to his proposal.

Palestinians and Israeli settlers clashed on 6 May 2021. Palestinian protesters had been holding nightly outdoor iftars. On 6 May, Israeli settlers and Jewish Power set up a table across the street from the Palestinians. Social media videos showed both sides hurling rocks and chairs at each other. Israeli police intervened to keep the peace and arrested at least 7 people. The pending evictions are considered a contributory cause of the 2021 Israel–Palestine crisis.

Israel's Supreme Court had been expected to deliver a ruling on 10 May 2021 on whether to uphold the eviction of Palestinian families from the Sheikh Jarrah neighbourhood that had been permitted by a lower court. The order covers 13 families, 58 people including 17 children. Six families were to be evicted by 2 May (subject to Supreme Court ruling) and a further seven families by 1 August. On 9 May 2021, the Israeli Supreme Court delayed the expected decision on evictions for 30 days, after an intervention from Attorney General of Israel Avichai Mandelblit.

On 2 August 2021, the High Court of Justice urged four Sheikh Jarrah families to accept a compromise deal that would nullify eviction orders and allow them to remain in their homes, but would require the families to recognise Israeli ownership of the properties. The court asked the families to consider an offer by which one member of each family would be granted lifetime protected tenancy on the property in exchange for annual payments of ₪1,500 (about US$420). Both Hamas and the Palestinian Authority pressured them to reject the deal. The families rejected the proposal, refusing to recognise Israeli ownership, and the hearing was adjourned. At a press briefing following the adjournment, US State Department spokesman Ned Price said "We have made this point before: Families should not be evicted from homes in which they have lived for decades."

On 2 August 2021, a number of Sheikh Jarrah families rejected a court proposal to stay as "protected tenants" but to recognize Israeli ownership and the hearing was adjourned. On 4 August, the families were asked to provide by 10 August 2021 a list of tenants in their household and their legal ties to the property in regards to the respective parties' claimed contracts with the Jordanian government. No date was set for any future hearing. On 15 August 2021 the court temporarily suspended evictions of three families. On 4 October 2021, the court presented a "detailed compromise proposal" intended to "end the threat of eviction for the foreseeable future". The court set a date of November 2 to consider the position further, in the meantime the parties might reach agreement between them or the court would ultimately rule based on the arguments and evidence presented. On 2 November 2021, the Palestinians rejected the compromise and the court will now need to rule on the Palestinians' appeal against the eviction order.

=== Um Haroun (Nahalat Shimon) ===
The Salem family (currently 11 persons) have been living in their home for the past 70 years, were to be evicted on 29 December 2021. The head of the European Union's mission to the West Bank and Gaza Strip, Sven Kuhn von Burgsdorff, visited the family on 23 December and called the eviction "inhuman and unfair." Jerusalem city councilman Aryeh King, and his colleague Jonathan Yosef, two key settlement activists in Sheikh Jarrah assert they are the legal owners of the home, saying they had purchased the house from Jewish owners who had owned the house before 1948. The settlers requested, with the support of the police, a new date for the eviction for one of the days between January 20 and February 8, 2022, without announcing in advance on which day it will take place. According to WAFA, on January 21, 2022, a group of Israeli settlers led by King, under heavily armed police protection, re-installed barbed wires previously installed on 15 December, around the land as a prelude to the eviction.

On 20 January 2022, eviction was set for a date between March 1 and April 1, 2022. Since 12 February, Israeli police restricted exit and entry to the area and on 13 February, far-right politician Itamar Ben-Gvir set up a makeshift office next to the Salem home. On 18 February the UN's Humanitarian Country Team in Palestine met the family and in a press release stated "The United Nations has repeatedly called for a halt to forced evictions and demolitions in the occupied West Bank, including East Jerusalem... under humanitarian law, forcible transfers of protected persons by the occupying power are forbidden regardless of their motive,". On 19 February, the foreign ministers of the Munich Group, at the Munich Security Conference, said "“We stress the need to refrain from all unilateral measures that undermine the Two-State Solution and the prospects of a just and lasting peace, in particular the building and expansion of settlements, the confiscation of land and the eviction of Palestinians from their homes, including in East Jerusalem, as well as from any acts of violence and incitement," and "In this context, we stress that the rights of the residents of Sheikh Jarrah and Silwan neighborhoods with regard to their homes must be respected.". On 22 February 2022, the court froze the eviction order pending the hearing of an appeal.

=== Expropriations ===
Separately, on 1 November 2021, the Israeli supreme court ordered the confiscation of an unrelated 4,700 square metre property privately owned by Palestinians and located at the entry of Sheikh Jarrah, for the benefit of the Israeli municipality.

In another case, on 18 January 2022, the Jerusalem municipality initially demolished a plant nursery owned by the Salahia family of seven adults and five children, returning in the early hours of 19 January to evict the family and demolishing their home drawing international attention and condemnation. The city and police said in a joint statement that "These illegal buildings had been preventing the construction of a school which can benefit the children of the entire Sheikh Jarrah community," The family said they purchased the property before 1967 and while they were unable to prove ownership, the municipality had anyway expropriated the property in 2017. Laura Wharton of the city council said "I protest, object and regret the conduct of the whole thing and expect the municipality and the government to begin treating every resident with equality and respect,".

== International law ==
The international community considers East Jerusalem to be Palestinian territory held under Israeli occupation. Israel effectively annexed the territory and considers it part of its capital city, though this move has been rejected by the international community. The Office of the United Nations High Commissioner for Human Rights (OHCHR) has called on Israel to stop all forced evictions of Palestinians from Sheikh Jarrah, saying that if carried out the expulsions of the Palestinians would violate Israel's responsibilities under international law which prohibit the transfer of civilians in to or out of occupied territory by the occupying power. A spokesman for the OHCHR said that such transfers may constitute a "war crime". Human rights organizations have been critical of Israeli efforts to remove Palestinians from Sheikh Jarrah, with Human Rights Watch releasing a statement saying that the disparate rights between Palestinian and Jewish residents of East Jerusalem "underscores the reality of apartheid that Palestinians in East Jerusalem face." Israeli human rights group estimate that over 1,000 Palestinian families are at risk of eviction in East Jerusalem. On 16 February 2022, the speaker for the UN Secretary-General, Stéphane Dujarric, stated: "It is very important to de-escalate the tension and maintain self-control and tranquillity. We continuously ask the Israeli authorities to put an end to the policy of demolishing Palestinian homes and stop evicting Palestinians in Sheikh Jarrah and anywhere else in the West Bank."

== Israeli law ==
After East Jerusalem and the West Bank were captured and occupied by Israel during the Six-Day War in 1967, the status of properties in East Jerusalem that had previously been owned by Jews, as in Sheikh Jarrah, has been in dispute. At the time there were no Jews living in Sheikh Jarrah, all having been evacuated in 1948 and not permitted to return. Palestinian refugees who had been expelled or displaced from their homes in Jaffa and Haifa in the 1947–1949 Palestine war and their descendants were being housed in Sheikh Jarrah.

In 1970, on the other hand, Israel enacted a law to allow Jews to reclaim property which they owned in East Jerusalem, despite having already been given expropriated Palestinian-owned property in compensation. This asymmetry has been pointed out by numerous observers. This arrangement does not exist in the rest of the West Bank, as the Israeli government decided that it would create tension, risk public order and lead to equivalent and much more numerous claims by West Bank Palestinians to reclaim their property in Israel.

In 1972, the Israeli Custodian General registered the properties under the Jewish trusts, the Sephardi Community Committee and the Committee of the Knesset of Israel, which demanded that the Palestinian residents pay rent to the trusts. In 1980, Israel effectively annexed East Jerusalem, including the properties in question, and in consequence Israeli property laws commenced to apply to these properties. Under Israeli land and property laws, Israelis have the right to reclaim properties in East Jerusalem that had been owned by them before the 1948 Arab–Israeli War, but the reverse does not apply. The Palestinian Authority does not recognise the Israeli annexation of Jerusalem and insists that Palestinian land laws apply to land transactions in East Jerusalem, which forbid any sale of land to Jews in the Palestinian territories.

In 1982, after the Sephardi Community and the Knesset Israel Committees claimed ownership of the land in a joint civil suit, raising the threat of eviction of the residents, but also having ramifications in provisions for future tenants to pay rent to them and requiring their permission to carry out renovations. A majority of the resident Palestinian families in question signed an agreement being allowed to live there with protected tenancy statutory status, its Israeli version derived specifically from the Tenant Protection Law of 1972, "which is intended to provide, inter alia, protection from evictions and was applied to residents of East Jerusalem after the imposition of Israeli law", with provisions reflecting the Committees' ownership, however they learned of such only after the agreement was approved by the court. Upon this discovery, they rejected not only these owners; "recognition of the families’ status did not require the acknowledgement of the Committees’ ownership", but also the applicability of the status to themselves.

In 2003, according to Israeli investigative journalist Uri Blau, the trust properties with their six homes were purchased for $(US)3 million and registered through a pyramid of companies registered abroad, in tax havens such as Delaware and the Marshall Islands. Beneath these companies lies an Israeli firm, Nahalat Shimon Ltd., established in 2000. Corporate and legal records point to two important figures in the operation: a partner in the New York law firm, Braun & Goldberg, namely Seymour Braun as company director and Tzahi Mamo, an Ofra settler and realtor specializing in the purchase of West Bank properties and the eviction of their residents. The right-wing Nahalat Shimon settler association, associated with the company has since made repeated attempts to evict the Palestinian residents to enable Jewish settlers to move in.

== Bibliography ==
- Golan-Agnon, Daphna (2020). "Sheikh Jarrah: Queer Theory and the Nature of Law". Teaching Palestine on an Israeli University Campus: Unsettling Denial. Anthem Press. ISBN 978-1-78527-502-9.
- Joint written statement* submitted by Al-Haq, Law in the Service of Man, Al Mezan Centre for Human Rights, Palestinian Centre for Human Rights, non-governmental organizations in special consultative status, submitted to the United Nations Human Rights Council, 23 February 2021
- Ben-Hillel, Yotam (May 2013). The Absentee Property Law and its Implementation in East Jerusalem: A Legal Guide and Analysis (PDF) (Report). Norwegian Refugee Council.
- The Sheikh Jarrah Affair: The Strategic Implications of Jewish Settlement in an Arab Neighborhood in East Jerusalem, Jerusalem Institute for Israel Studies
- "Enforcing Housing Rights: The Case of Sheikh Jarrah" (PDF). Avocats Sans Frontières.
- Dispossession and Eviction in Jerusalem, The Civic Coalition for Defending Palestinian Rights in Jerusalem
- Evictions and Settlement Plans in Sheikh Jarrah: The Case of Shimon HaTzadik, Ir Amim
- "Sheikh Jarrah" (PDF). OCHAoPT.
- Survey of Palestinian Neighborhoods in East Jerusalem, Bimkom
- Systematic dispossession of Palestinian neighborhoods in Sheikh Jarrah and Silwan, Peace Now
