= Shimon HaTzadik =

Neighborhood of Jerusalem, Israel

Coordinates: 31°47′32.6″N 35°13′51.46″E

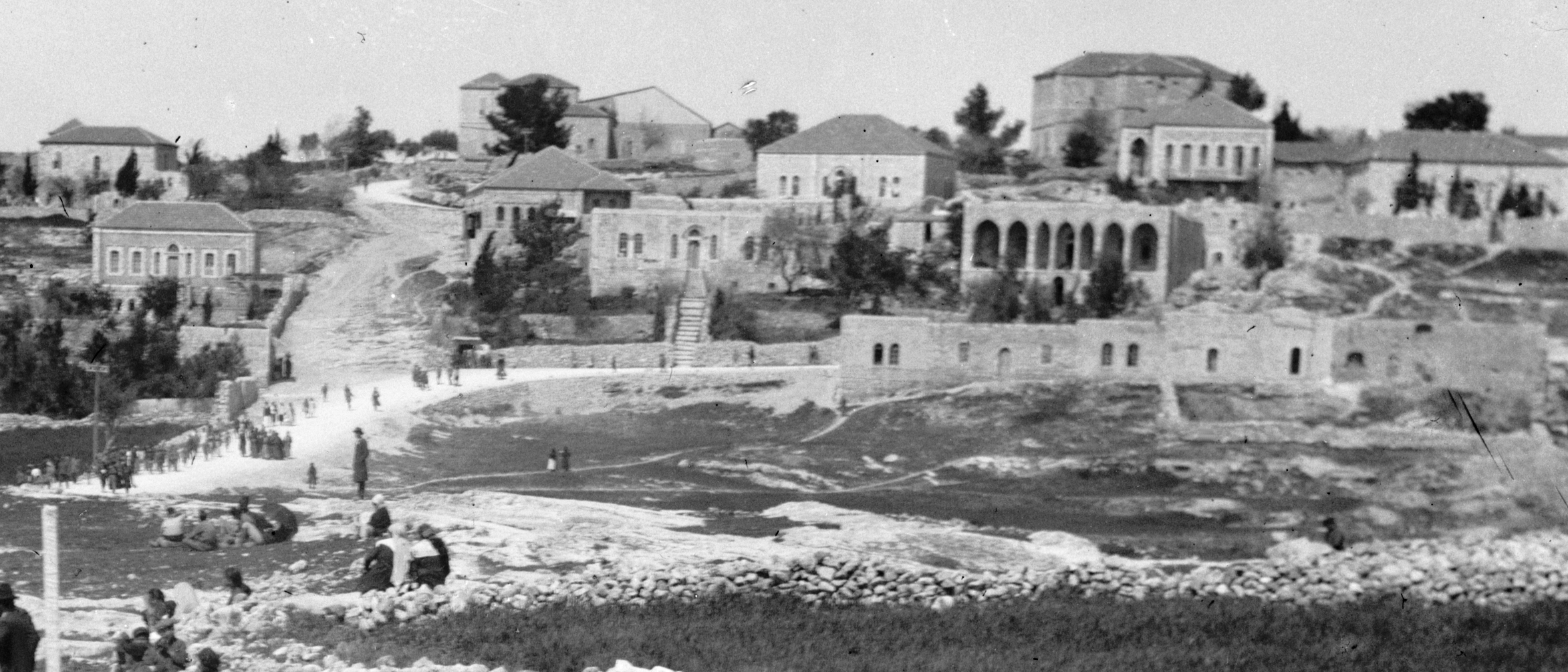

Shimon HaTzadik (Hebrew: שמעון הצדיק) is an Israeli settlement in East Jerusalem, established around the Tomb of Simeon the Just, after whom it was named. The neighborhood was established in 1890 and abandoned during the 1948 Palestine War. At the beginning of the new millennium after a long legal battle, Jewish residents settled down in the area near the Arab neighborhood of Sheikh Jarrah.

== History ==
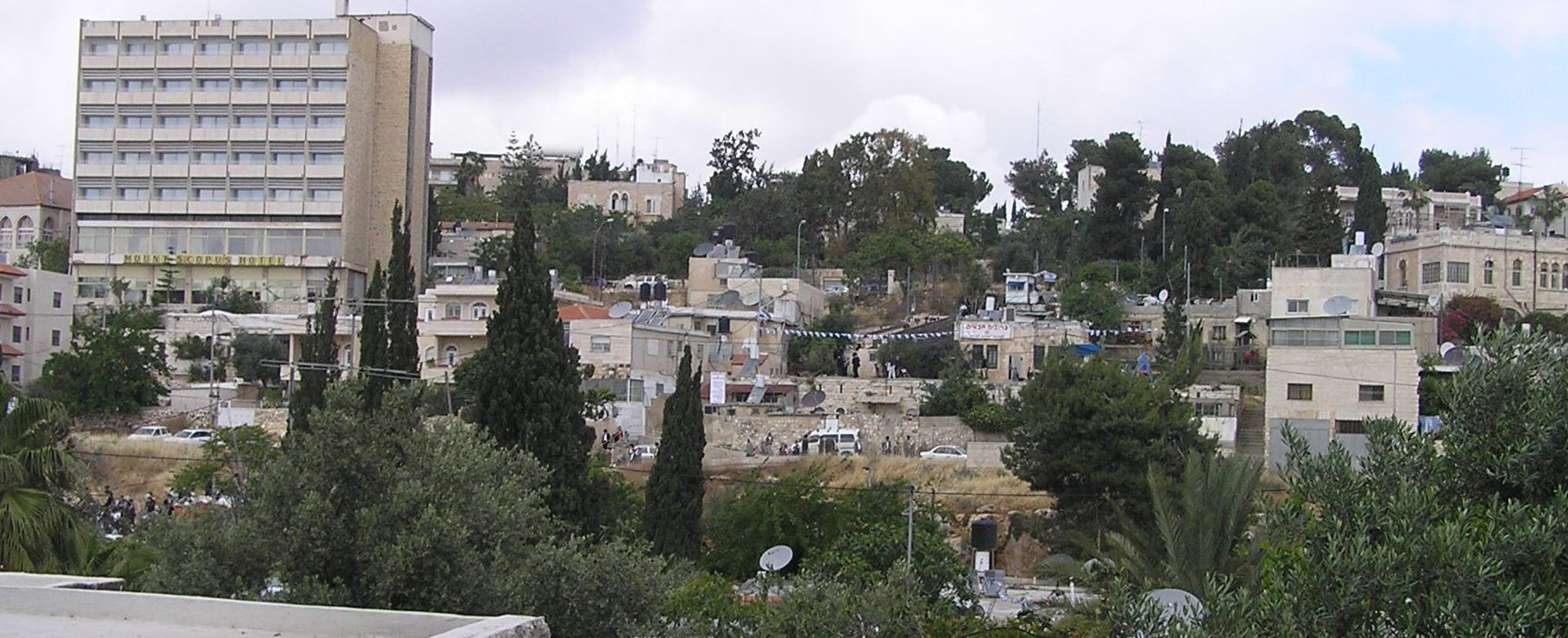

The Shimon HaTzadik tomb and its surroundings, with an area of 17 dunam, was purchased by the Sephardi Community Council and Knesset Yisrael in 1875. Near the neighbourhood is the Cave of the Minor Sanhedrin. The area was subdivided in 1890 for the purpose of establishing a residential neighborhood, and the neighborhood passed to the Sephardi Community Council. At the year 1890, the Sephardi Jews community in the aria north to the site, on the slope above the area of Shimon HaTzaddik 6 houses for people with Economic difficulties, known as "בתי הקדש שמעון הצדיק". during that time people started to build private houses in the area, and the rest converted to Agricultural land and olive harvest site.

In the book ירושלים שכונות סביב לה, Kluger describes the construction of the neighborhood:

In the month of Tishrei 1851, the foundation stone was laid for houses "shelters for the poor and needy, widows and orphans", in the field plot that the heads of the Sephardic community in Jerusalem bought for several years next to the cave in which the holy Tanna north of the Knesset remains. In Hadrat Kodesh, the cornerstone was laid in the presence of the city's rabbis, greats and dignitaries. The money for the construction of these houses was collected by Rabbi Shlomo Suzin in the cities of Gibraltar, Kaza-Blanka, Mazgan, Izomer and Mogador. Being there on a mission including the Spaniards, he volunteered to collect special alms for this purpose without any reward. Rabbi Suzin brought with him a total of 10,000 francs and handed them over the banker ce' Chaim Aharon and Liro, the head of the committee, with these money they began to build several houses. By-laws: The apartments are intended for the poor, by fate, and will be replaced every three years.

In the year 1916, 13 families lived in the neighborhood; there were 45 persons.

Beside that neighborhood, during the 20th another neighborhood was built named "Nahalat Shimon", purchased by the bankers Johannes Frutiger, and Yosef Navon. At first the neighborhood was developed by Yosef Meyuchas and later Nissim Elishar and Bezalel Kopel Kantrowitz. Dozens of Jewish families established their homes on the purchased land, and before the 1936–1939 Arab revolt in Palestine hundreds of Jews lived there. When the riots broke out, the Jews fled the area but returned to these neighborhoods a few months later.

=== 1947–1949 Palestine war ===
During the 1948 Palestine war residents of the Shimon Hatzadik neighborhood suffered attacks from Sheikh Jarrah residents. On 7 January 1948, three Jews were murdered, and other people wounded by Arab gangs. On 11 February 1948, the British ordered the residents of the "Shimon Hatzadik" and "Nahalat Shimon" neighborhoods to leave their homes out of concern for their lives. On 13 April of the same year, 78 members of Hadassah Medical Centerl staff, patients, members of Hebrew University of Jerusalem and fighters near the evacuated neighborhoods were murdered in the Hadassah medical convoy massacre. Forces of the Palmach rushed to help them but they were repulsed by the British forces during Mandatory Palestine. On Chol HaMoed of Passover holiday, the Palmach Occupied Sheikh Jarrah and the territory of the Jewish neighborhoods. The British forced them to retreat under the reasoning they needed the transport route that passed through the area. The British said they would update the Palmach when they finish transferring their forces through. Later when the British forces left, they only updated the Arabs who rushed and occupied the place, and the area of the neighborhood passed to Jordanian control.

In 1954, the Jordanian Commissioner for Enemy Property, in cooperation with UNRWA, allowed Palestinian refugees, who could no longer return to their property in Israel, to settle in a nearby area and build themselves two rooms each on a 33-year lease.

=== After Six-Day War ===
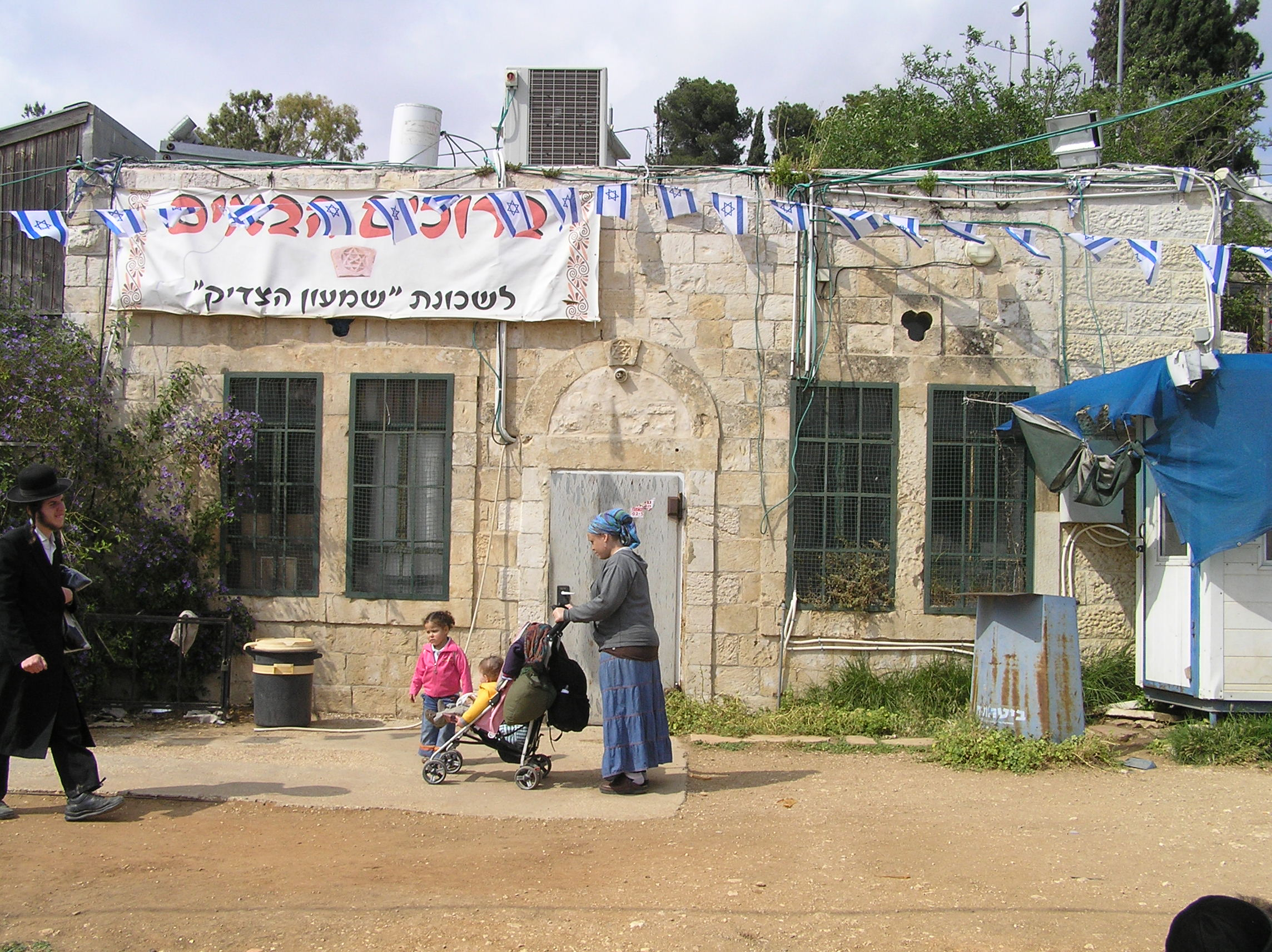
Synagogue in Shimon HaTzaddik

During the Six Day War, the area was occupied by Israel and the neighborhood was annexed to the state and became part of the municipal area of Jerusalem.

The post-war Jewish assets held by the Jordanian administrator General were transferred to the Israeli administrator General, in accordance with the law. In September 1972, the Israeli administrator General released ownership of the land to its owners, the Sephardic Community Committee in Jerusalem and the Knesset of Israel. The legal reason for this was that the ownership of the dedications remained the same because Jordan did not expropriate the land but appointed the "General administrator of the UN" in charge of it. In 1982, the two committees filed a lawsuit to realize their ownership of 17 apartments built in the area. As part of the legal proceedings, the parties reached an agreement, which was given the force of a judgment, according to which the Arab residents recognize the ownership of the place by the Jewish committees and at the same time the tenants will be granted "Assisted living" status. According to which it is their duty to pay rent to the committees and maintain the property properly. The residents of the houses strongly claimed that the agreement was signed behind their backs and that they were not even aware of it. In 1993, the committees filed a lawsuit to evict the residents from the apartments, claiming that they had lost "Assisted living" status because they didn't pay rent, and some didn't even maintain the properties properly and made changes in the structures without a permit.

In 1997, a Palestinian named Hajazi filed a claim for ownership of part of the building, but the court rejected his claim. Hajazi appealed to the Supreme Court and his appeal was dismissed. At the same time, claims by some Palestinian residents to repeal the 1982 agreement were rejected in court, which ruled that the agreement was binding. As a result, in 1998 a police force evacuated the Arab tenants from the neighborhood, and Jewish tenants entered.
