= Tombs of the Sanhedrin =

Underground complex of tombs in Jerusalem

Coordinates: 31°47′58″N 35°13′08″E

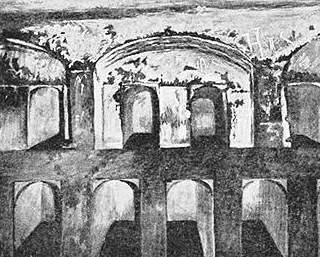
- Interactive map of Tombs of the Sanhedrin

Details
- Established: 1st century CE
- Location: Sanhedria, Jerusalem
- Country: Israel
- Type: Rock-cut tombs
- No. of graves: 63

Tombs of the Sanhedrin (Hebrew: קברי הסנהדרין, Kivrei HaSanhedrin), also Tombs of the Judges, is an underground complex of 63 rock-cut tombs located in a public park in the northern Jerusalem neighborhood of Sanhedria. Built in the 1st century CE, the tombs are noted for their elaborate design and symmetry. They have been a site for Jewish pilgrimage since the medieval period. The popular name of the complex, which has the most magnificently carved pediment of ancient Jerusalem, is due to the fact that the number of burial niches it contains is somewhat close to that of the members of the ancient Jewish supreme court, the Great Sanhedrin, namely 71.

== Name ==
In 1235, Rabbi Jacob the Emissary called them the "Tombs of the Righteous", writing that the tombs housed the remains of "many wise men". They were first called the Tombs of the Sanhedrin by Rabbi Joseph Halevi in 1450, and have been known by that name among Jews ever since.

In Christian literature, Joannes Cotovicus mentioned the tombs, without naming them, in 1598. In 1611, English traveller George Sandys called them the Tombs of the Prophets. They were named Tombs of the Judges – referring to the "judges" of the Great Sanhedrin – by Franciscus Quaresmius in the early 17th century. This is the name they are known by among non-Jews.

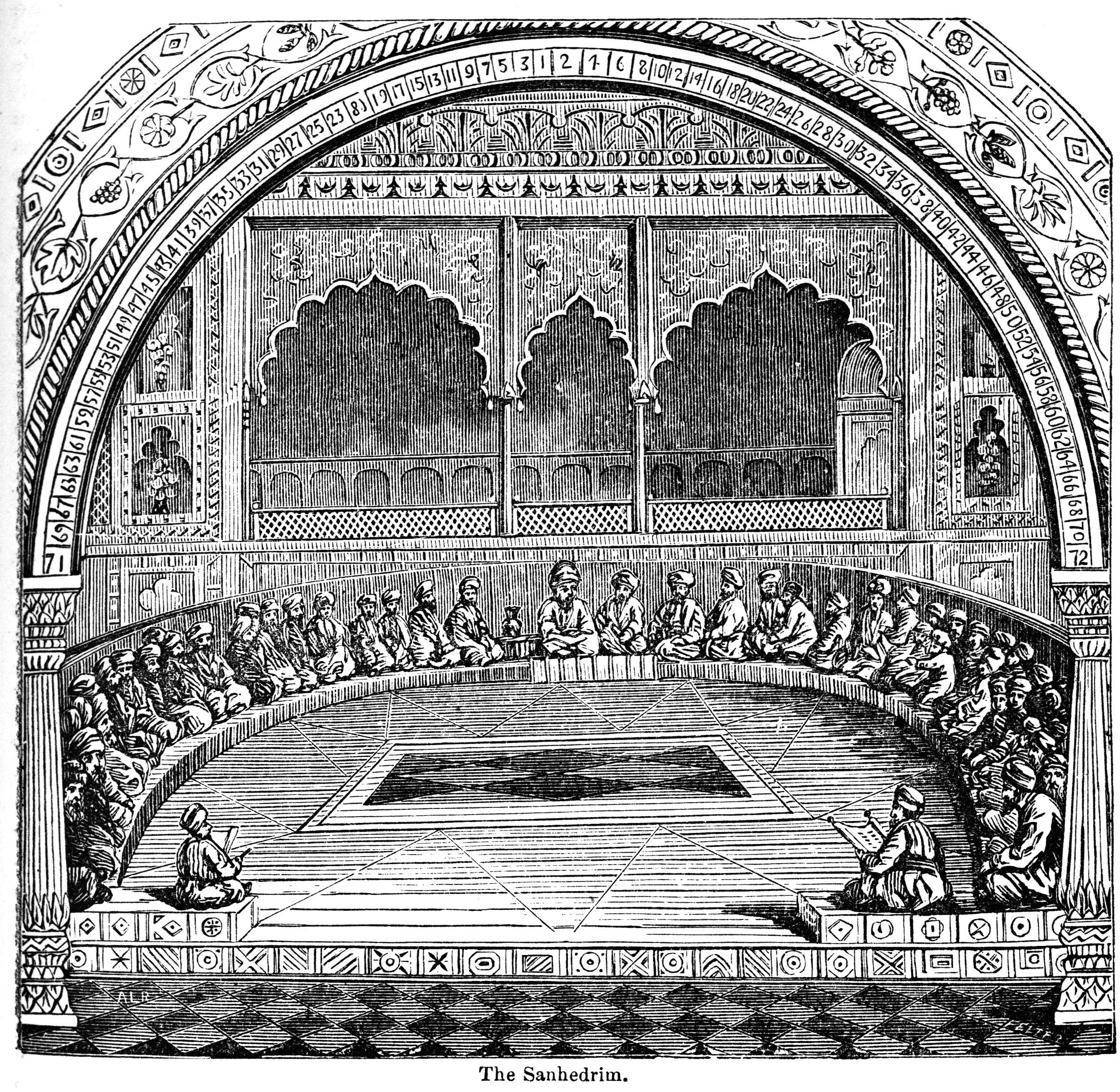
An 1883 encyclopedia illustration of the Sanhedrin in session.

In the absence of identifying plaques or other indications as to the ownership of the tomb, historians speculate that the name "Tombs of the Sanhedrin" was applied because the tombs contain nearly as many burial niches as the number of members (71 to 73) of the Sanhedrin, the Jewish supreme court from the time of the Second Temple till the 5th century. However, many archaeologists refute any connection to the Sanhedrin. In Durchs Heilige Land (Basel, 1878), a journal of travel in the Holy Land, Swiss theologian Hans Konrad von Orelli said he believed that the Tombs of the Sanhedrin and the Tombs of the Kings (Kivrei HaMelakhim) were not necessarily connected to the names people associated them with. Instead, this could have been a burial cave for a wealthy Jewish family.

== History ==
The Tombs of the Sanhedrin have been a site for Jewish pilgrimage and prayer since the thirteenth century. Since medieval times, Jews considered the tombs holy and would not pass by them without stopping to pray there. In the mid-1800s, the tombs were demarcated by a huge boulder that guided pilgrims to the site.

The Tombs of the Sanhedrin are located at the head of the Valley of Jehoshaphat in northwest Jerusalem. They are part of a giant necropolis situated to the north and east of the Old City of Jerusalem and dating to the Second Temple period. Archaeologists have surveyed close to 1,000 burial caves within 3 miles (4.8 km) of the Old City, dating to this period. Graves were most likely placed at great distances from the Old City in order to preserve the special laws of purity incumbent on priests serving in the Temple in Jerusalem. Rock-cut tombs like those of the Tombs of the Sanhedrin were typically commissioned by wealthy Jewish families of the era, with monumental facades carved with floral and geometric motifs.

The Sanhedria necropolis covers an area of approximately 10 dunams (1.0 hectare; 2.5 acres).

In his 1847 book, The Lands of the Bible Visited and Described, English archaeologist John Wilson describes his exploration of the Tombs of the Sanhedrin:

"From the Tomb of Simeon the Just, I proceeded further on, to the Tombs of the Sanhedrin. These, like the former, are under ground, hewn in the solid rock. The entrance here is still lower, and I was obliged, in some parts, to lay flat down and slide in; but when once inside, I found large vaulted chambers. I counted sixty-three niches where sarcophagi had formerly been placed. In each of these three tombs there were numberless names written on the walls by devout Jews who had visited them".

== Courtyard and facade ==
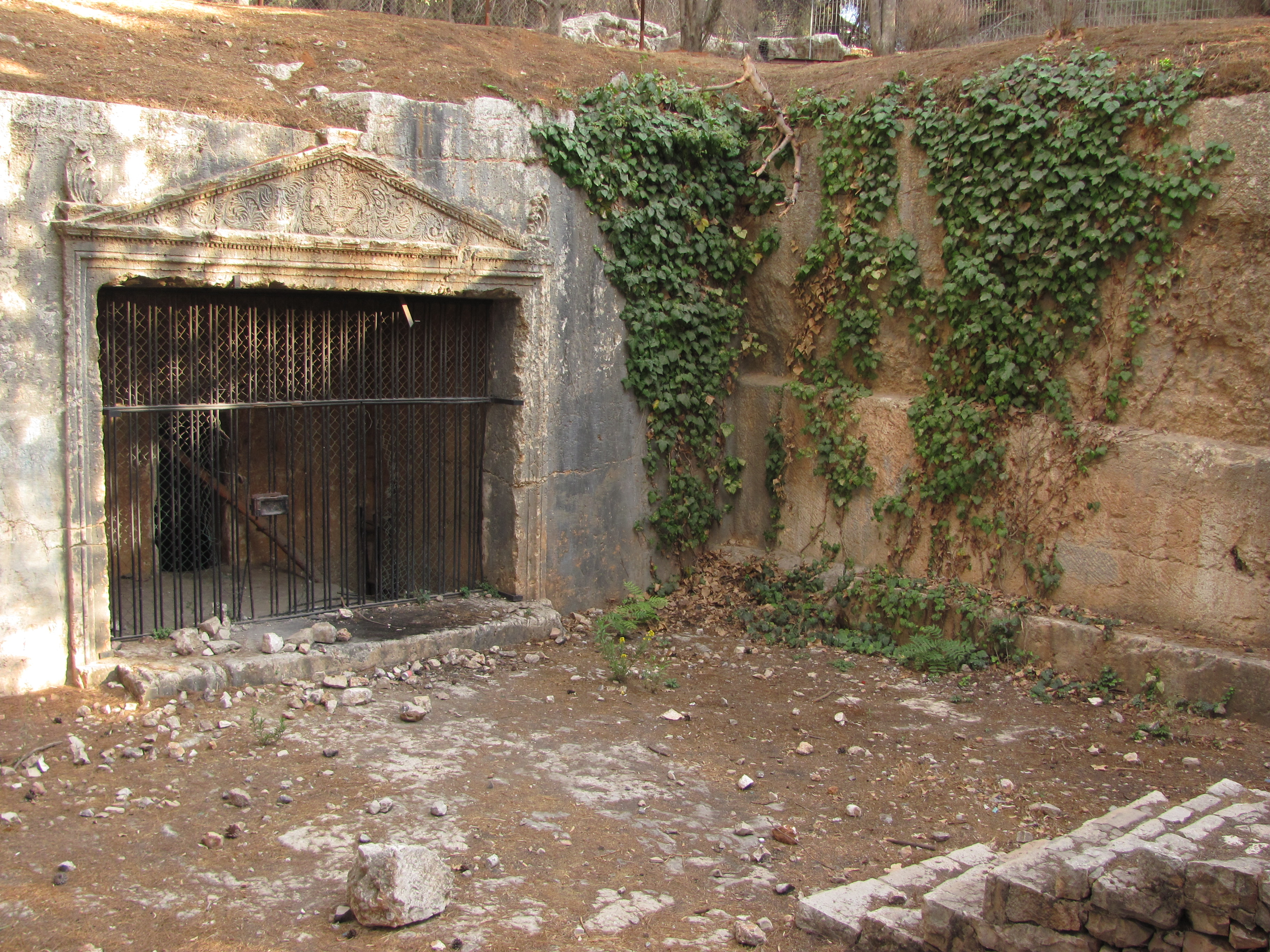
Forecourt and outer entrance

An ancient quarry was reshaped into a forecourt, with the burial caves hewn out of the living rock on one side. The forecourt has rock-hewn benches for the benefit of visitors. An elaborately carved Grecian pediment above the large, square entrance is decorated with plant motifs, including acanthus leaves entwined with pomegranates and figs, representative of Judeo-Hellenistic burial art of the 1st century. After a step, a rock-hewn room open towards the forecourt and walled on the other three sides allows entrance to the central burial chamber. The entrance was originally closed by a stone door and is topped by a small pediment.

The facade of the tomb appeared differently in medieval times. One report describes a "beautiful structure" containing "caves within caves". A 1659 drawing shows an entrance with a grand, arched colonnade.

== Burial cave ==
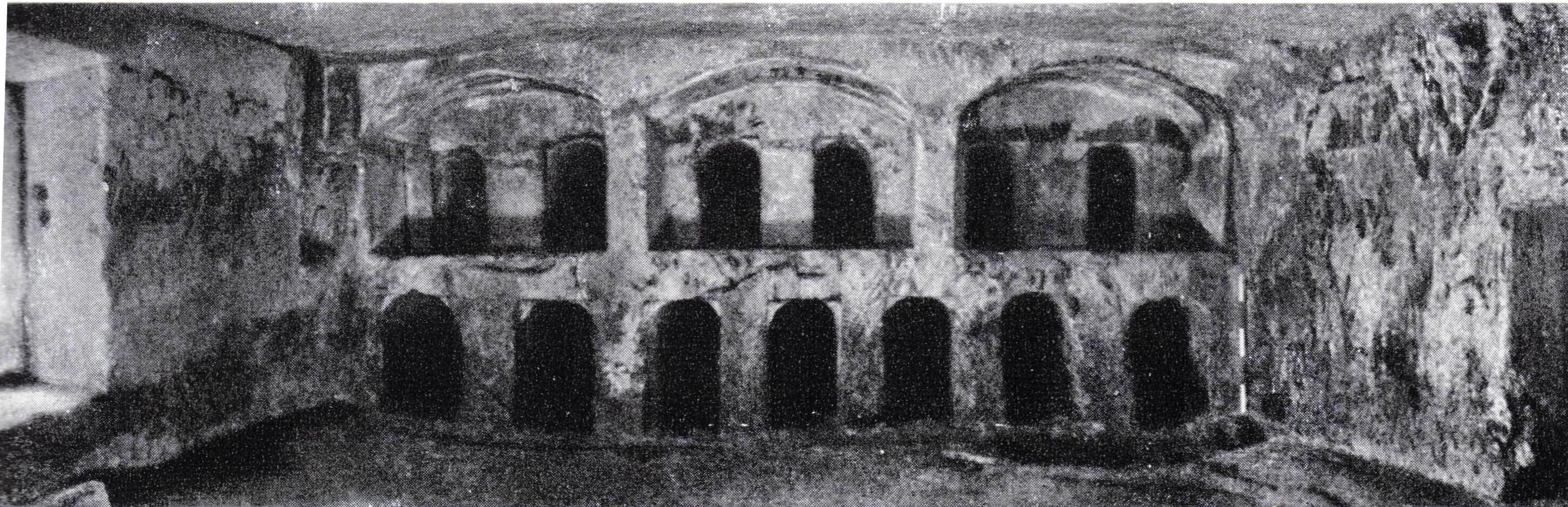
Burial niches in the main chamber

Inside are four burial chambers on two levels. The largest chamber, just inside the entrance, contains 13 arched loculi (burial niches) arranged on two tiers, one atop the other, with arcosolia dividing the niches into pairs. Each niche measures 50 centimetres (20 in) by 60 centimetres (24 in). A further 9 burial niches are located in a second chamber off the first, and 10 to 12 more niches can be found below-stairs from the main chamber in a chamber on the second level. A fourth chamber on a third level appears as an independent entity with its own entryway. The burial niches are arranged differently in each chamber, although each chamber is designed with an eye to symmetry. All told, there are 63 burial niches in the tomb, along with several cubicles and niches for bone collection. Stone ossuaries were found in rock-cut vaults within the complex.

In the late 1860s, a French archaeologist, Louis Félicien de Saulcy, investigating the tombs, discovered an ossuary lid inscribed with the name Yitzchak (Isaac) in Hebrew, which he took back with him to France, where it is still held by the Louvre Museum.

Opinions differ as to how the bodies were placed in the niches. According to Har-El, Jews placed their deceased either in stone sarcophagi in the niches; or laid them on the floor until the soft tissue decayed, and the collected their bones into ossuaries, which they placed in vaults. Williams and Willis quote an archaeologist who opines that the bodies, swathed in burial clothes, were placed directly into the niches, which were then closed or sealed with a stone slab.

== Public access ==
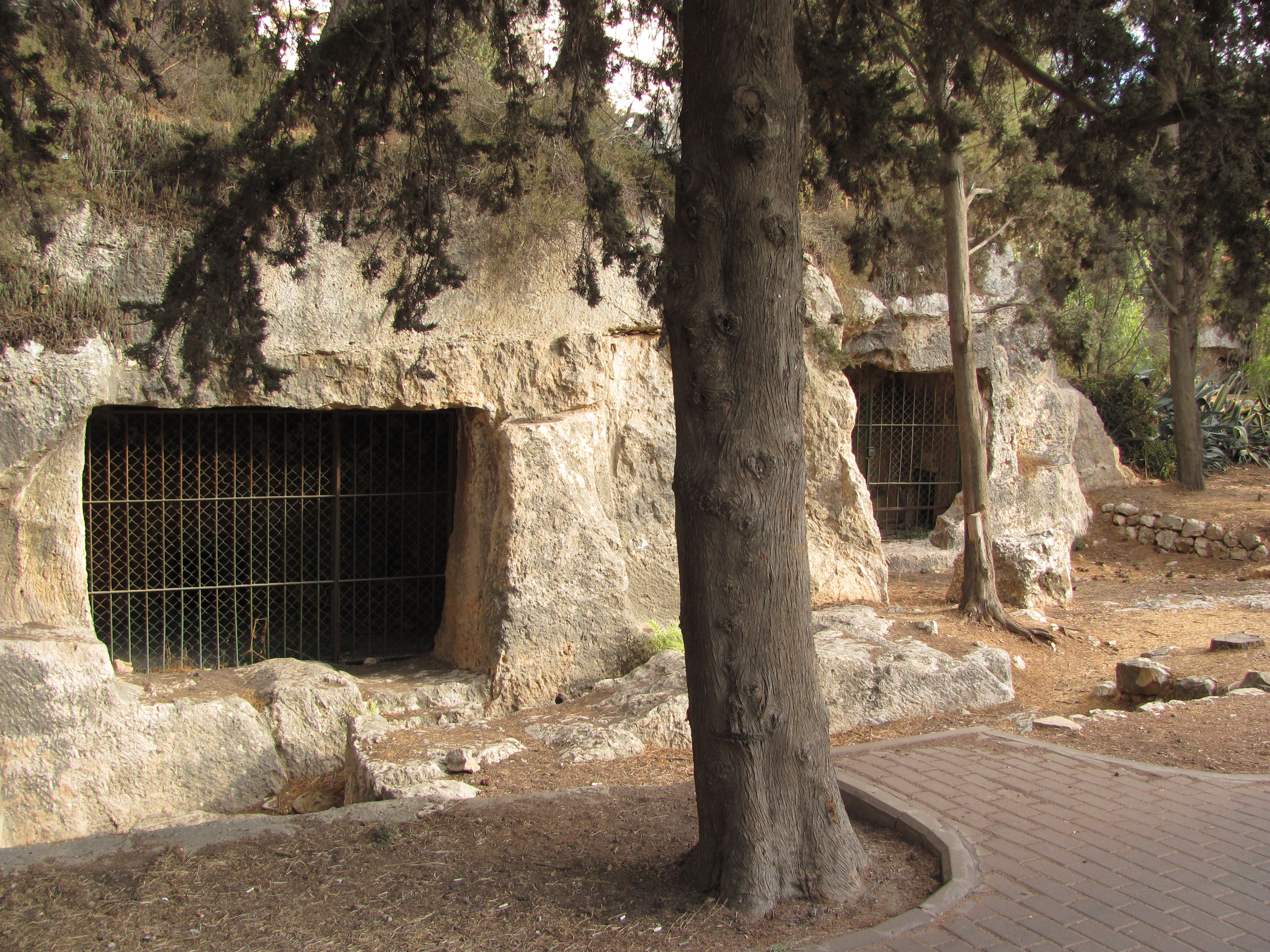
Other rock-cut tombs in Sanhedria Park

Through the 20th century, the tombs were open to the public. In the 1930s, a young Shlomo Moussaieff claimed he found ancient coins in the caves and sold them to support himself after his father threw him out of the house.

Following the establishment of the State of Israel in May 1948, the Old City of Jerusalem was captured by the Arab Legion; it was later recaptured by the Israelis in the Six-Day War of 1967. Throughout the intervening 19-year period, many ancient graves, placed in Jordanian-held East Jerusalem, were off-limits to Jewish visitors. As a result, the Tombs of the Sanhedrin, by virtue of being on the Israeli side, became an often-visited site.

In the 1950s, the Jerusalem municipality planted pine trees around the site, which is in close proximity to several other 1st- and 2nd-century rock-cut tombs, and created a public garden called Sanhedria Park. The adjacent Jewish neighborhood of Sanhedria was also named for the tombs.

In the 2000s, access to the Tombs was restricted due to vandalism and a gate was placed across the entrance. The tombs have been defaced by graffiti and the forecourt is often clogged with garbage and filth. Several clean-up efforts have been mounted by civilian volunteers.

== Commemoration ==
In the 1950s, the State of Israel issued a 500 prutah banknote that depicted the facade of the tombs.

== See also ==
- Rock-cut tombs in Israel
- Cave of the Minor Sanhedrin
- Tomb of Simeon the Just
