= Sanhedria =

Neighborhood in Jerusalem

Coordinates: 31.798379°N 35.220805°E

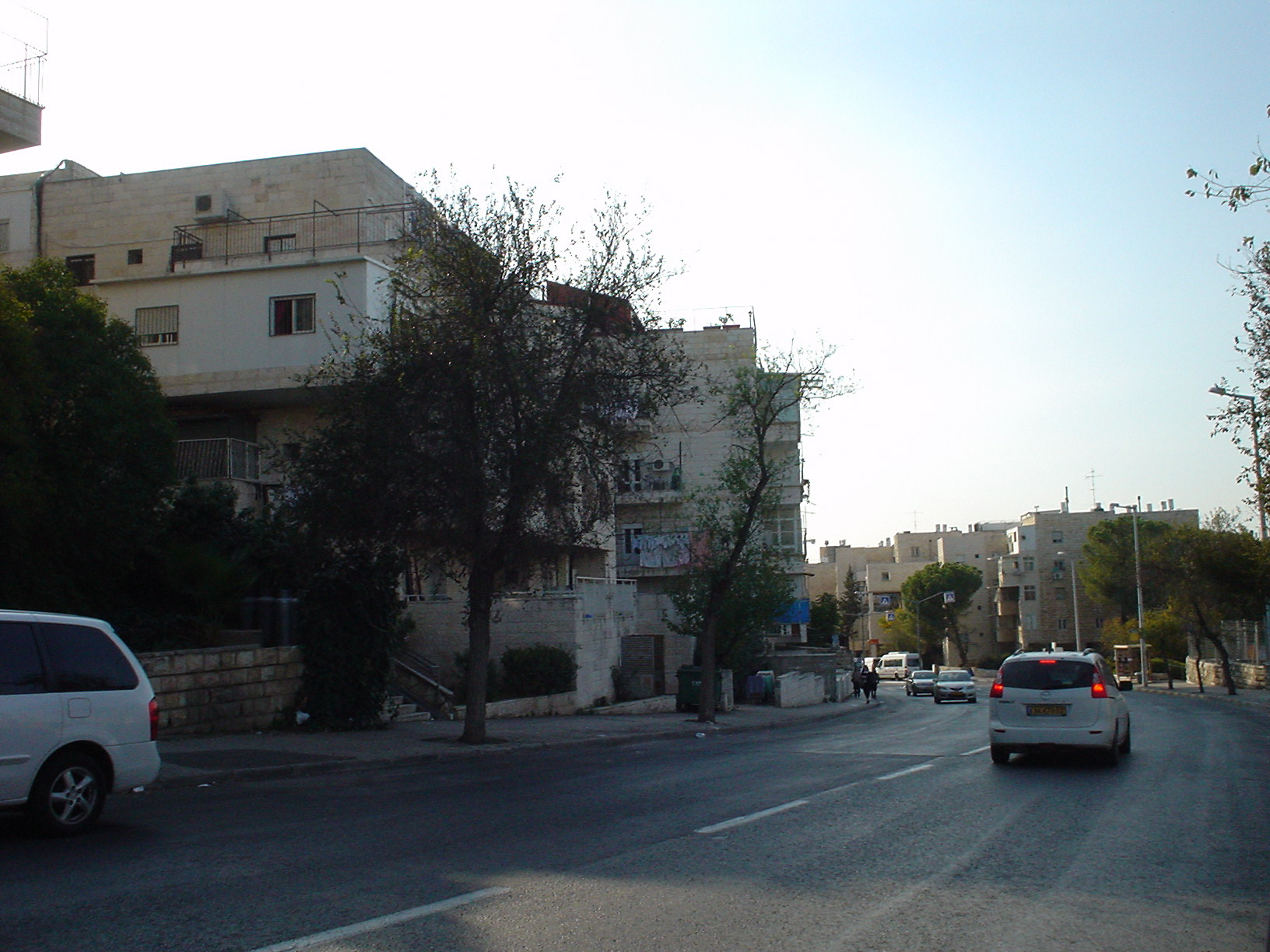
Yam Suf Street, Sanhedria

Sanhedria (Hebrew: סנהדריה) is a neighborhood in northern Jerusalem. It lies east of Golda Meir Street, adjacent to Ramat Eshkol, Shmuel HaNavi, Maalot Dafna and the Sanhedria Cemetery.

== History ==
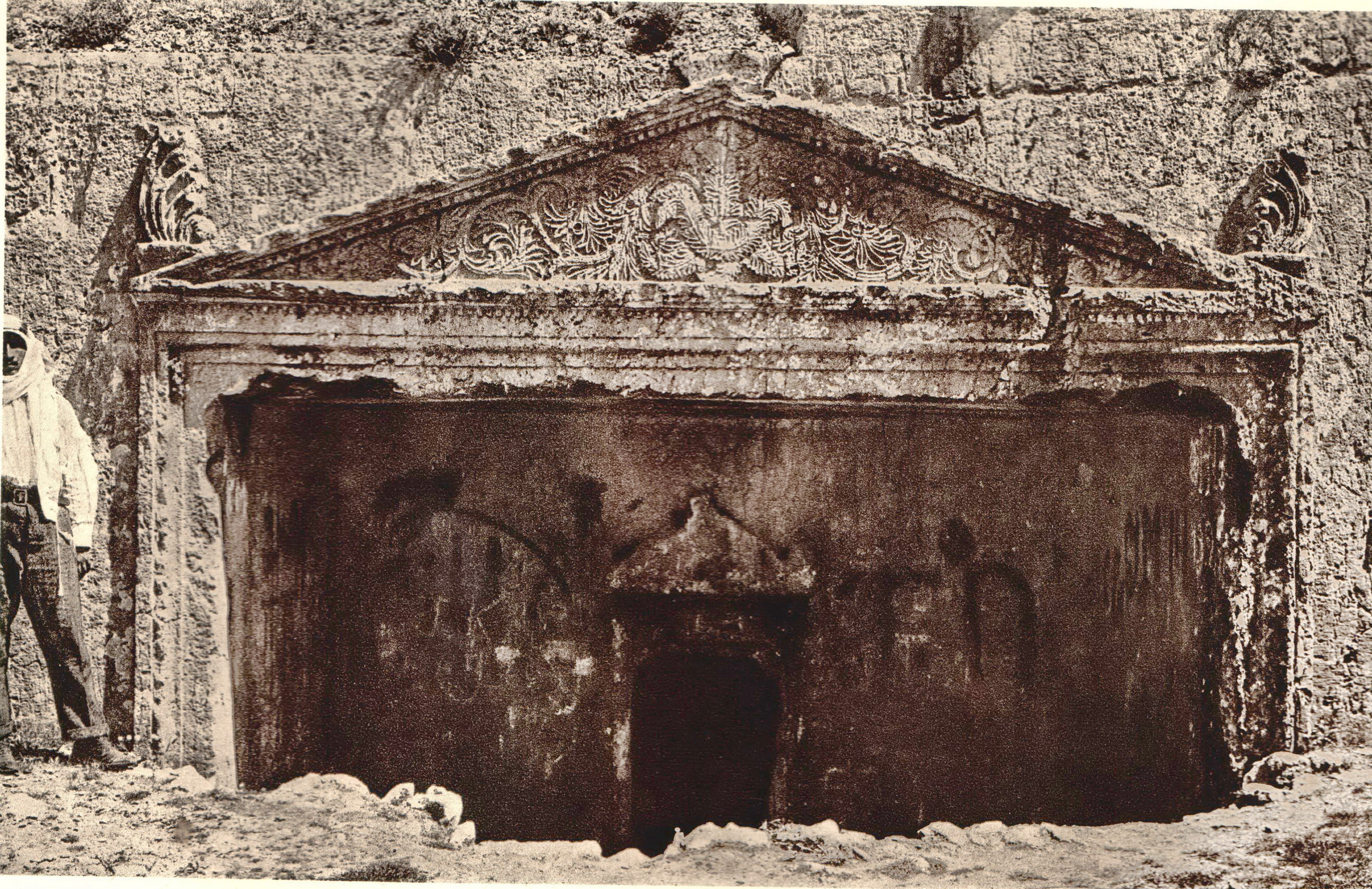
Tombs of the Sanhedrin

Sanhedria is named after the Tombs of the Sanhedrin, an elaborate underground complex of rock-cut tombs constructed in the 1st century and thought to be the burial place of the members of the Sanhedrin.

Until 1967, Sanhedria was a frontier neighborhood adjacent to the Jordanian border and dominated by privately owned Jewish agricultural plots. After the Six Day War, construction of new housing led to an influx of newcomers from the religious community who were attracted by the location, within walking distance of the Old City and Western Wall (2 km). Many institutions were built in the neighborhood.

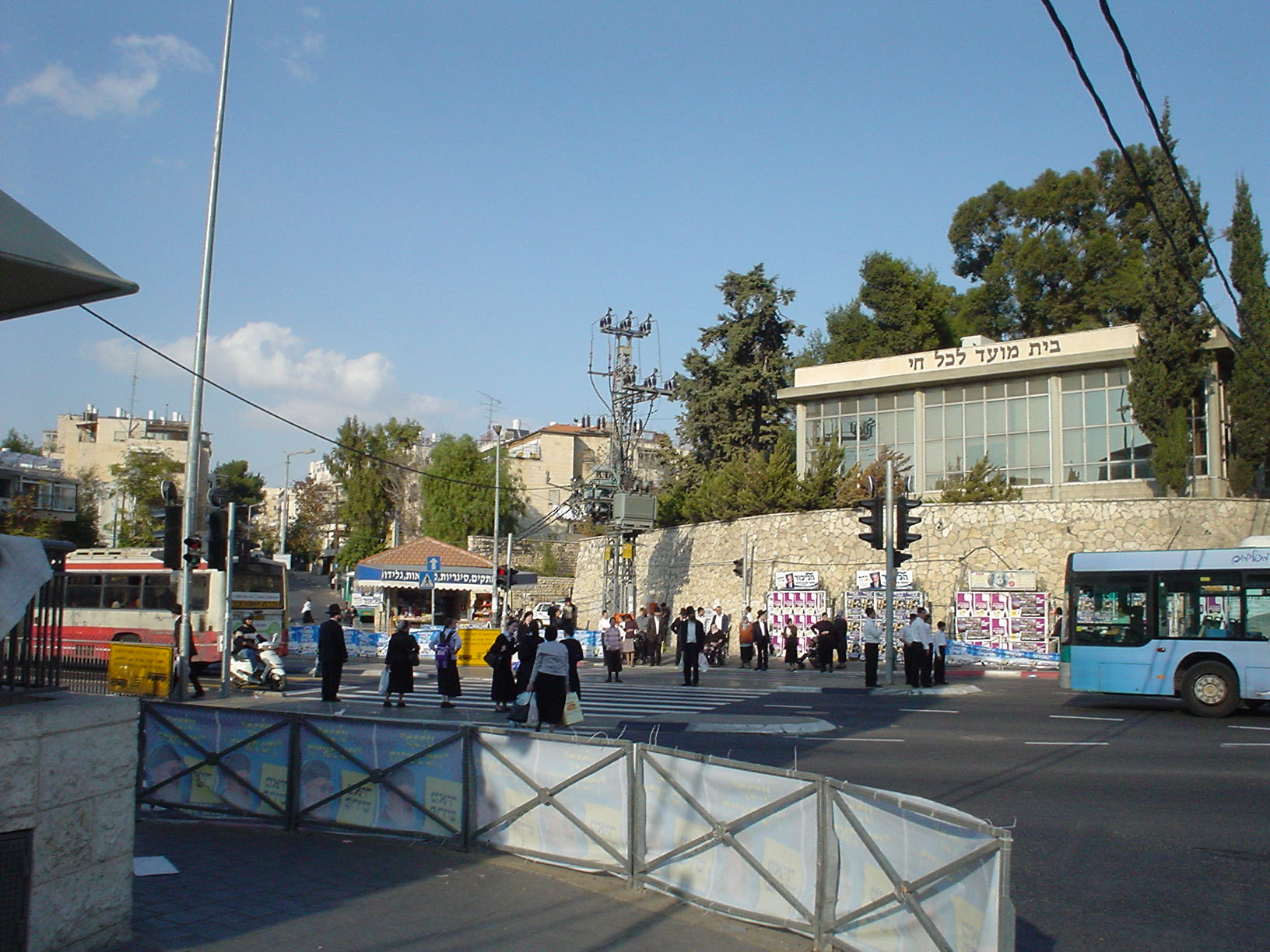
The Sanhedria cemetery on the right and the entrance to the neighborhood on the left

Until the 1980s, the neighborhood was composed of Haredi, National-Religious and secular Jewish families. Today most of the residents are Haredi, covering several subgroups: Hasidim, Lithuanian Jews (27%) and Sephardim.
