= Cave of the Minor Sanhedrin =

Ancient Jewish burial cave in Jerusalem

- מערת הסנהדרין הקטנה (Hebrew)
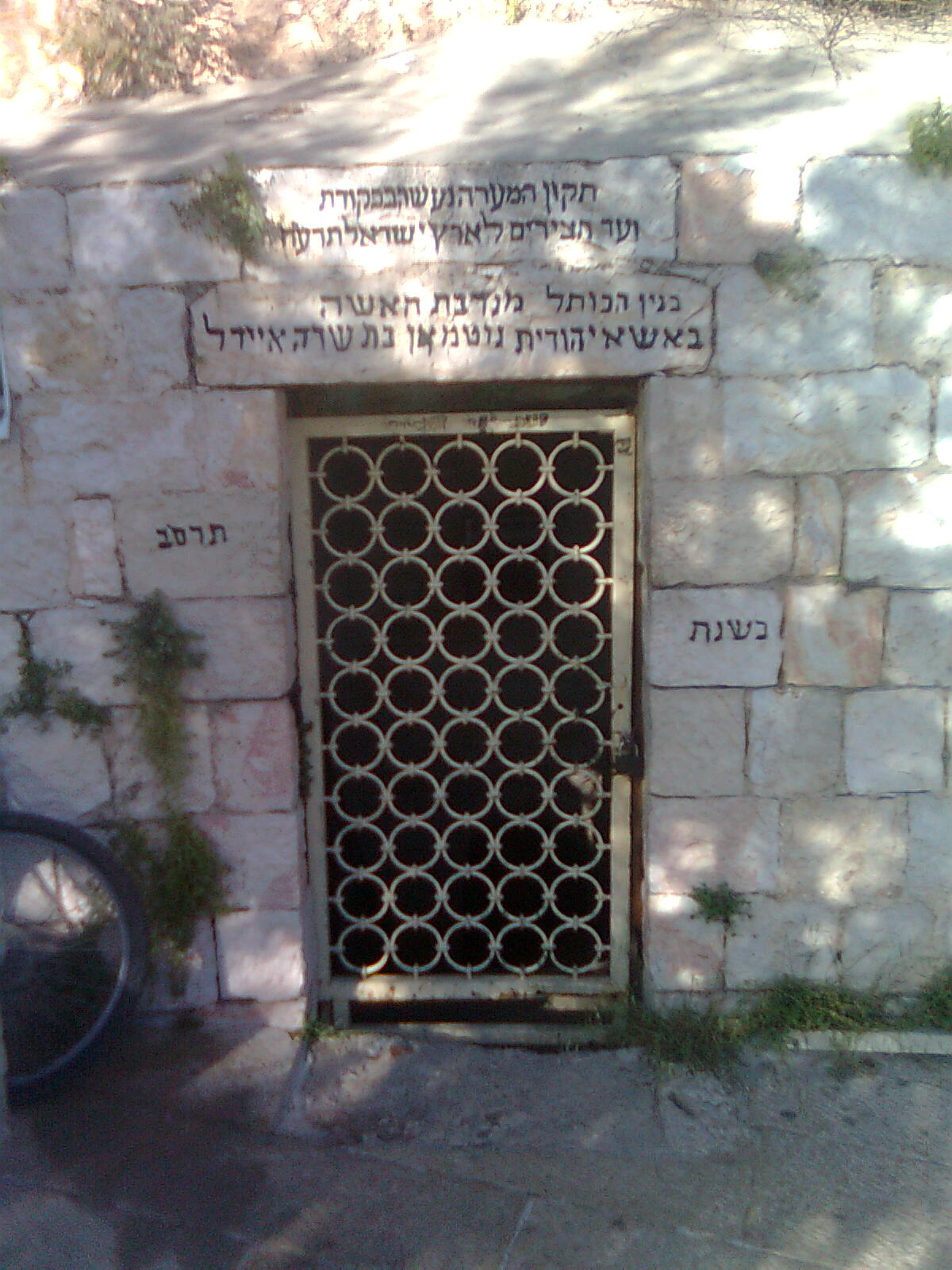
- Cave entrance
- Interactive map of Cave of the Minor Sanhedrin
- 31.7920426°N 35.2304935°E
- Location: Sheikh Jarrah, Jerusalem

Site notes
- Condition: Preserved
- Public access: Restricted

The Cave of the Minor Sanhedrin is a burial cave located next to the Tomb of Simeon the Just in the Sheikh Jarrah neighborhood of Jerusalem. It contains 26 burial niches, in which the 26 members of the Minor Sanhedrin are said to be buried. There are also other burial caves in the complex.

The cave was plundered in the 19th century by Louis Félicien de Saulcy and another French archaeologist. They plundered the contents of the caves, scattering the bones of the buried people around the cave, before fleeing to the Jaffa port. This infuriated the local Jewish community, who turned to public figures like Moses Montefiore who acted to get the Turkish government to cancel their license to excavate.

The bones were collected by local Jews, and buried in a grave next to the nearby Tomb of Simeon the Just. Artifacts from within the cave, including burial vaults and stones with Hebrew writing on them, are now displayed in the Louvre.

After the plundering, a Jewish woman purchased the site in order to preserve it due to its holiness.

Today, the cave entrance is locked and can only be visited in cooperation with the site management. In addition, a Kabbalistic prayer is held there weekly.

== See also ==
- Rock-cut tombs in ancient Israel
- Tomb of Simeon the Just, nearby and contemporary burial cave
- Tombs of the Sanhedrin, nearby and contemporary burial cave
