= Nahalat Shimon =

Historical Jewish neighborhood in East Jerusalem

Coordinates: 31°47′26.52″N 35°13′41.66″E

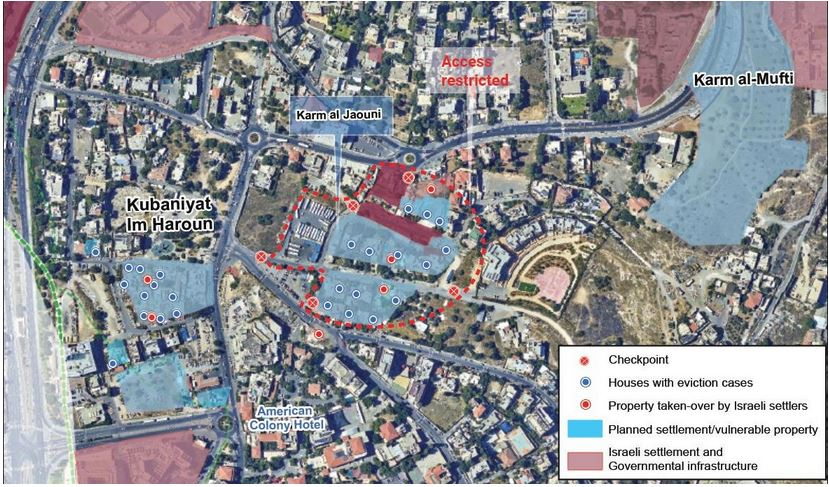
Sheikh Jarrah, Um Haroun area and pending eviction proceedings

Nahalat Shimon (Hebrew: נחלת שמעון. lit. Simeon's Estate) was a Jewish religious neighborhood of about 40 Jewish families in East Jerusalem in the area currently known as Sheikh Jarrah. (Note: Nahalat Shimon was divided into an eastern section called Karm al-Jaouni, where land was owned by the councils of the Jewish Ashkenazi and Mizrahi communities. Land in the western section, called Umm Haroun, where Ben-Yair’s family lived, was privately owned by Jewish families.) It was founded in 1891 by Sephardic and Ashkenazi Jewish Kollels, to house poor Yemenite and Sephardi Jews. The cornerstone of the neighborhood was laid in 1890, near the Tomb of Simeon the Just.

== History ==
Nahalat Shimon was located at the tip of the Kidron Valley, west of the tomb of Simeon the Just. The namesake Jewish settler organization contends that the land was purchased in 1890 and the first homes were built soon after, housing 20 impoverished families, and that by 1947 there were 100 Jewish homes in the neighborhood. In March 1948, due to mounting Arab violence during the 1948 Arab–Israeli War, the British ordered the residents to evacuate within two hours. According to one of the evacuees, Justice Emeritus Michael Ben-Yair, all these Jewish evacuees from Sheikh Jarrah were given Palestinian homes in West Jerusalem in compensation. Meanwhile, the Palestinians who were given housing in the Sheikh Jarrah neighborhood by Jordanian authorities in exchange for in a relinquishing their refugee documents and accompanying rights have no right under Israeli law to repossess their pre-1948 homes in Haifa, Sarafand and Jaffa. The settler organization Nahalat Shimon, registered in Delaware, has pursued the case in Israeli courts for decades, demanding eviction of the Palestinian residents so that Jewish settlers can be housed there.

== See also ==
- Expansion of Jerusalem in the 19th century
