= Tomb of Simeon the Just =

Alleged tomb in Jerusalem

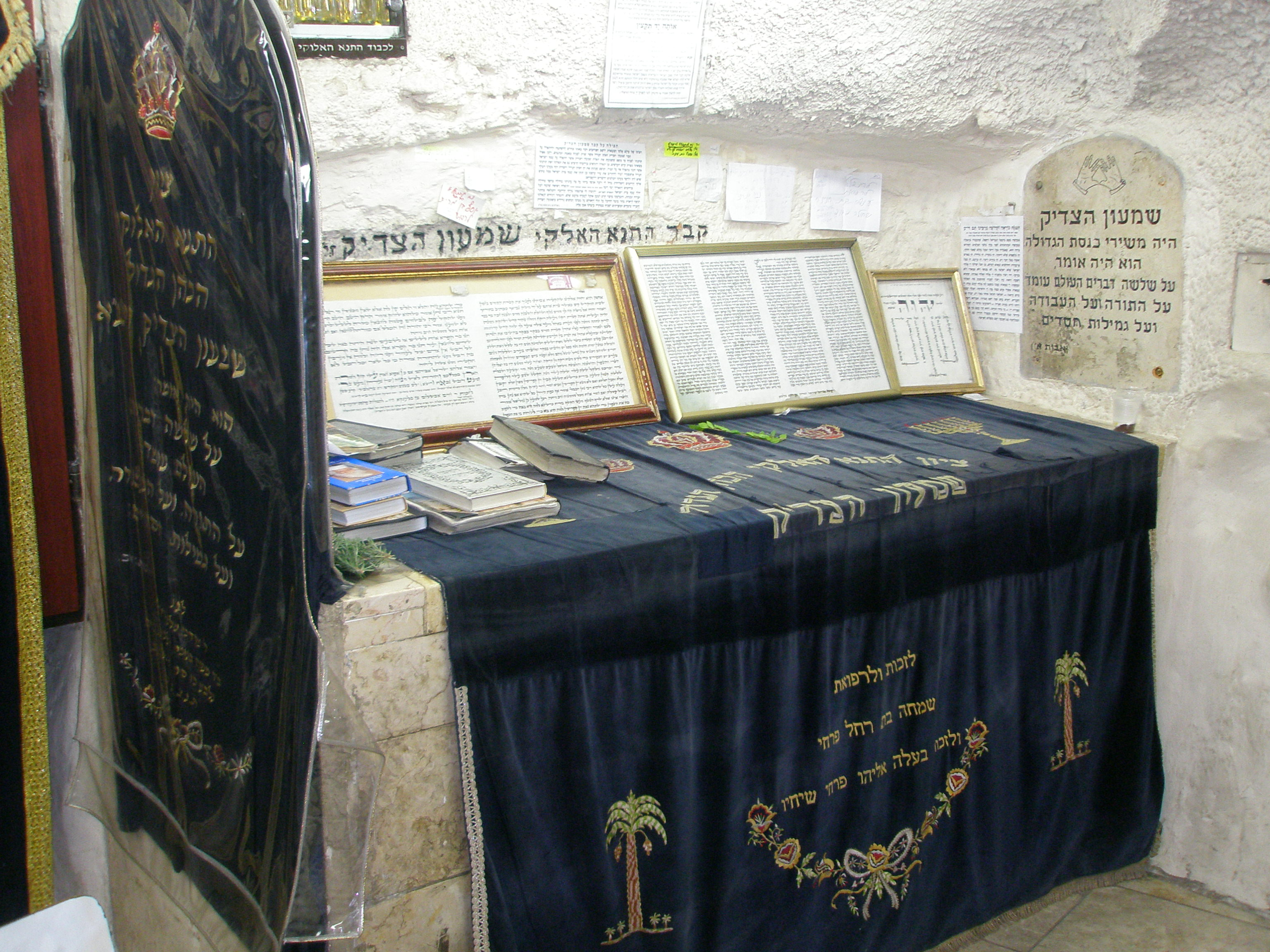

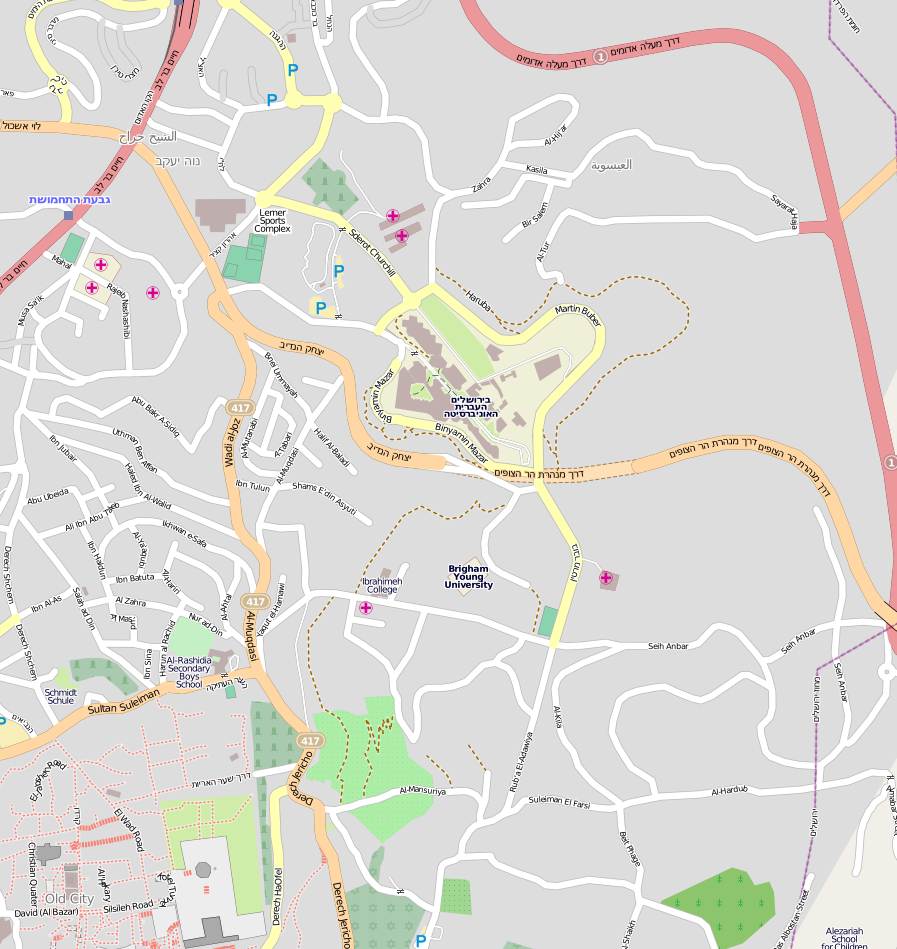
- Location within East Central Jerusalem Location within Jerusalem
- 31.79186°N 35.23062°E
- Type: burial chamber
- Location: 'Uthman Ibn 'Affan Street; Shimon HaTzadik, East Jerusalem

History
- Built: 2nd century CE

Site notes
- Public access: Free

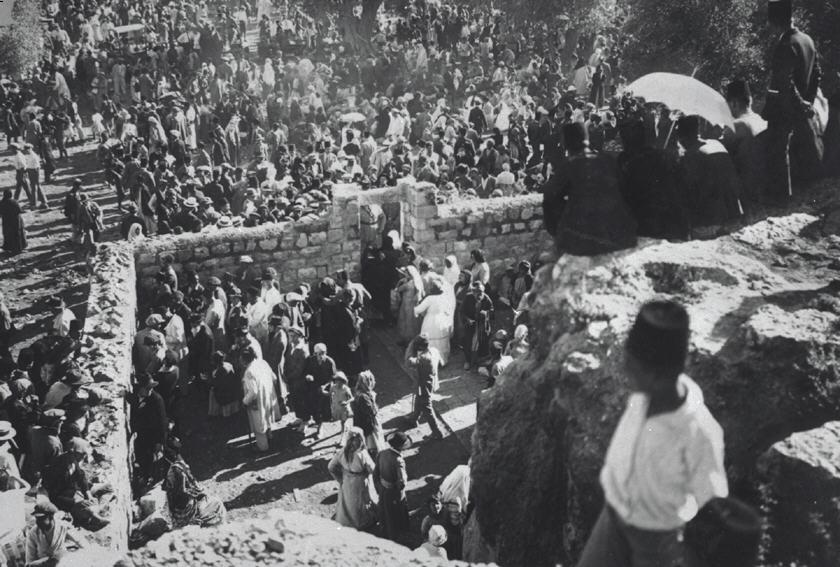
Jews visiting the tomb in 1927

The Tomb of Simeon the Just or Simeon the Righteous (Hebrew: קבר שמעון הצדיק, romanized: Kever Shimon haTzadik) is an ancient tomb in Jerusalem. According to scholarly consensus, based on an in situ inscription, it is the 2nd-century CE burial site of a Roman matron named Julia Sabina. However, according to a medieval Jewish tradition, is believed to be the burial place of Simeon the Just and his students. It is located adjacent to the Cave of the Minor Sanhedrin in the Shimon HaTzadik settlement within the Sheikh Jarrah neighborhood.

== Identification ==
=== Galilee location ===
In the 12th century, Benjamin of Tudela wrote that the tomb of Simeon was at "Tymin or Timnathah", between Tiberias and Meiron.

=== Jerusalem location ===
Rabbi Jacob, the messenger of Jehiel of Paris, wrote in 1238–1244 that "the cave of Simeon the Just and his disciples is near Jerusalem". Obadiah da Bertinoro wrote around 1490 that "The sepulchre of the seventy Elders, which lies about 2,000 cubits from Jerusalem, is splendid, especially that of Simon the Just."

== History ==
The tomb, c. 1900

During the Ottoman period, Wasif Jawhariyyeh mentions the site as the location of communal festivities known as the Yehudia, attended by Jewish, Christian, and Muslims in honour of Shimon the Just.

While Jewish people flock to the tomb of Shimon bar Yochai on Lag Ba'omer to perform the Upsherin ceremony, the Tomb of Simeon the Just is used by many as an alternative location. A 19th century traveller, John Wilson, describes this practice in his book The Lands of the Bible Visited and Described, published in 1847.

The celebrations grew more popular in the 19th century. In earlier times, the Jewish celebration drew the interest of curious local non-Jews and foreigners, as well as Muslim vendors who sold a variety of food and drinks. These included coffee, tamarind juice, roasted chickpeas, cotton candy ("sha‘r al-banāt"), and dondurma.

== Authenticity ==
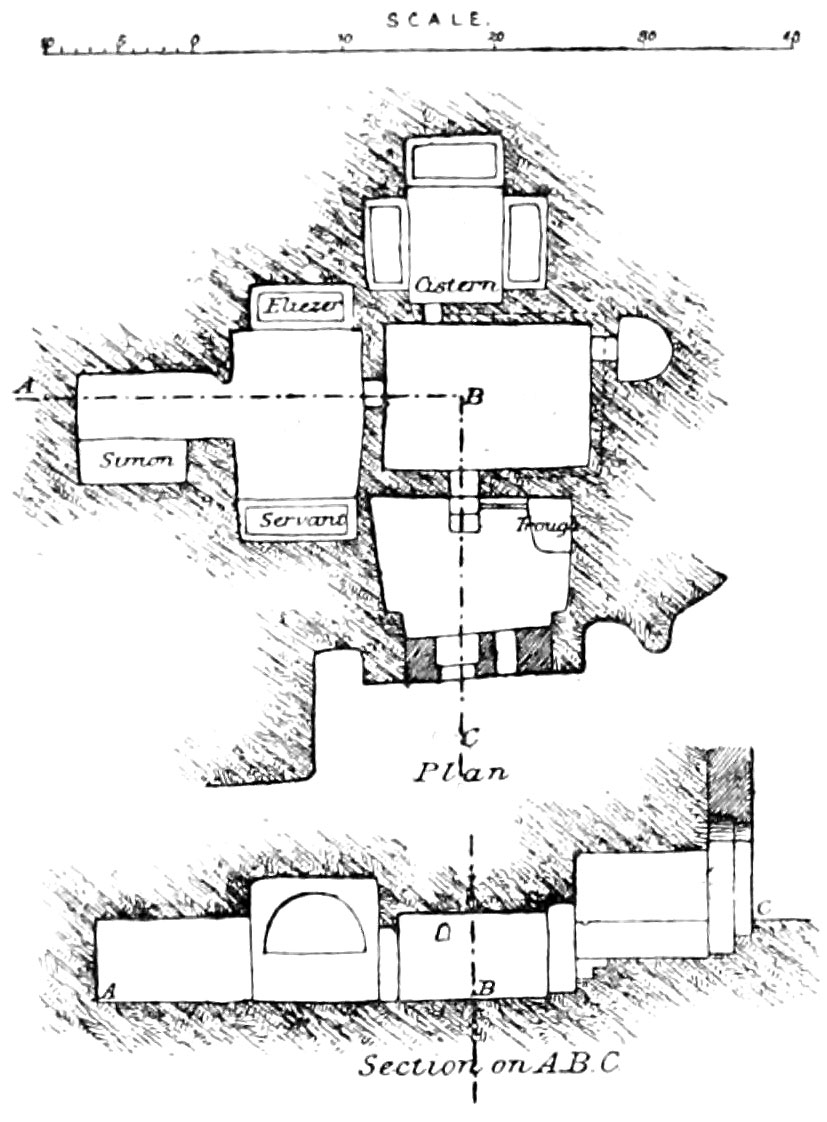
Plan and section made by Warren and Conder in the 1880s.

In 1871, Clermont-Ganneau discovered

a Roman inscription whose existence had escaped the notice of the archaeologists who had preceded me, even as it has that of those who have followed me, for up to the present day no one, as far as I know, has noticed it or mentioned it. It is not graffito, but a large inscription carved in lapidary style in a cartouche with triangular tabs at the ends, engraved on the back wall of the ante-chamber, above the low door, about two metres above the floor of the chamber.

The inscription had been badly damaged by hammering, but the first line clearly read Juliae Sabinae, indicating to Clermont-Ganneau that the tomb was that of a Roman matron named Julia Sabina. Clermont-Ganneau surmised that she was the wife or daughter of Julius Sabina, first centurion of the Tenth Legion "Fretensis", whose inscription elsewhere showed very similar lettering.

Because of this inscription, and other reasons, historians and archaeologists have reached the consensus that the tomb cannot be that of Simon the Just.

Kloner and Zissu date the tomb to the late Second Temple period. However, because of the absence of the narrow burial shafts called kokhim, they suggest it may have been used to store the bones of people originally buried elsewhere, rather than fresh corpses. Such a need arose when the "third wall" of Jerusalem surrounded many tombs during the first century CE, since Jewish law forbids burials within the city limits. Kloner and Zissu conjecture that the association with Simeon dated from the discovery during the Middle Ages of an ossuary bearing the common name "Simeon".

== See also ==
- Rock-cut tombs in Israel
  - Cave of the Minor Sanhedrin, nearby and contemporary burial cave
  - Tombs of the Sanhedrin, nearby and contemporary burial cave
- Simeon (Gospel of Luke), who is also referred to as Simon the Just and Simon the Righteous.
