= Second Temple period =

Period in Jewish history, c. 516 BCE–70 CE

- 516 BCE – 70 CE
Ancient Israel and Judah	Rabbinic period
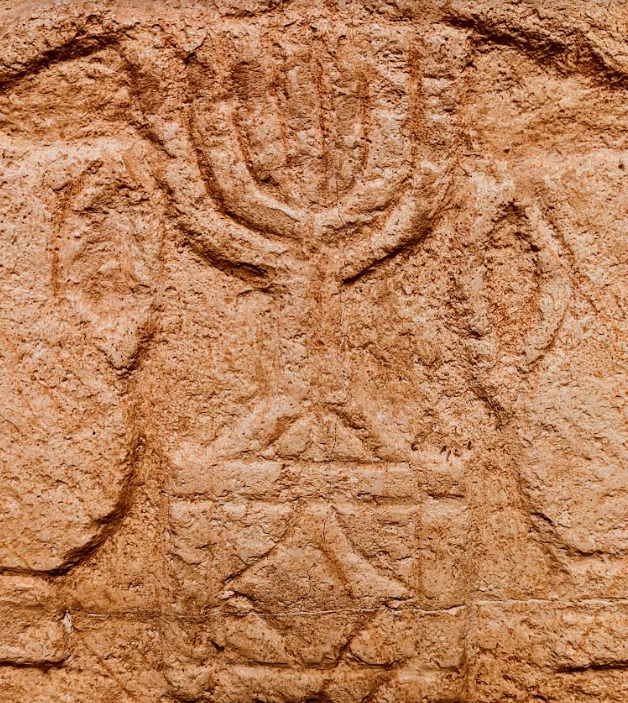
- The Temple menorah as depicted on the Magdala stone, early 1st century CE
- Duration: c. 6 centuries
- Location: Southern Levant
- Including: Persian; Hellenistic; Roman; periods
- Monarchs: Hasmonean; Herodian
- Key events: Return to Zion; Development of the Hebrew Bible canon; Maccabean Revolt; Hasmonean independence; Hasmonean civil war; Roman conquest; Crucifixion of Jesus; First Jewish–Roman War

The Second Temple period or post-exilic period in Jewish history denotes the approximately 600 years (516 BCE – 70 CE) during which the Second Temple stood in the city of Jerusalem. It began with the return to Zion after the Babylonian captivity and the subsequent reconstruction of the Temple in Jerusalem, and ended with the First Jewish–Roman War and the Roman siege of Jerusalem.

In 587/586 BCE, the Neo-Babylonian Empire conquered the Kingdom of Judah. The Judeans lost their independence upon the Babylonian siege of Jerusalem, during which the First Temple was destroyed. After the Babylonians annexed Judah as a province, part of the subjugated populace was exiled to Babylon. This exilic period lasted for nearly five decades, ending after the Neo-Babylonian Empire itself was conquered by the Achaemenid Persian Empire, which annexed Babylonian territorial possessions after the fall of Babylon. Soon after the conquest, Persian king Cyrus the Great issued a proclamation known as the Edict of Cyrus, encouraging the exiles to return to their homeland after the Persians raised it as an autonomous Jewish-governed province. Under the Persians (c. 539–332 BCE), the returned Jewish population restored the city and rebuilt the Temple in Jerusalem. In 332 BCE, the Achaemenid Empire fell to Alexander the Great, and the region was later incorporated into the Ptolemaic Kingdom (c. 301–200 BCE) and the Seleucid Empire (c. 200–167 BCE).

The Maccabean Revolt against Seleucid rule led to the establishment of a nominally independent Jewish kingdom under the Hasmonean dynasty (140–37 BCE). While it initially exercised governance semi-autonomously under Seleucid hegemony, the Hasmonean kingdom increasingly exercised total self-governance as it undertook military campaigns to push the weakening Seleucids out of the region, establishing itself as the last Jewish kingdom and preceding an almost 2000-year-long hiatus in Jewish sovereignty in the Levant. In 63 BCE, the Roman Republic conquered the kingdom. In 37 BCE, the Romans appointed Herod the Great as king of a vassal Judea. In 6 CE, Judea was fully incorporated into the Roman Empire as the province of Judaea. Growing dissatisfaction with Roman rule and civil disturbances eventually led to the First Jewish–Roman War (66–73 CE), resulting in the destruction of Jerusalem and its Temple, which ended the Second Temple period.

As Second Temple Judaism developed, multiple religious currents emerged and extensive cultural, religious, and political developments occurred. The development of the Hebrew Bible canon, the synagogue and Jewish eschatology can be traced back to the Second Temple period. According to Jewish tradition, prophecy ceased during the early Second Temple period; this left Jews without their version of divine guidance when they felt most in need of support and direction. Under Hellenistic rule, the growing influence of Hellenism in Judaism became a source of dissent for those Jews who clung to their monotheistic faith; this was a major catalyst for the Maccabean revolt. In the latter years of the period, Jewish society was deeply polarized along ideological lines, and the sects of the Pharisees, Sadducees, Essenes, Zealots, and early Christianity were formed. Important Jewish writings were also composed during the Second Temple period, including portions of the Hebrew Bible, such as the books of Ezra, Nehemiah, Esther and Daniel and writings that are a part of the Apocrypha and the Dead Sea Scrolls. Among the major sources for the time period are the writings of Josephus, Philo, the Books of the Maccabees, Greek and Roman writers and later Rabbinic literature.

The destruction of Jerusalem and the Second Temple in 70 CE is considered one of the most cataclysmic events in Jewish history. The loss of mother-city and temple necessitated a reshaping of Jewish culture to ensure its survival. Judaism's Temple-based sects disappeared. Rabbinic Judaism, centered around communal synagogue worship and Torah study, eventually evolved out of the Pharisaic school and became the mainstream form of the religion. During the same era, Christianity gradually separated from Judaism, becoming a predominantly Gentile religion. A few decades after the First Jewish-Roman War, the Bar-Kokhba Revolt (132–135 CE) erupted; its brutal suppression by the Romans further dwindled the Jewish population in Judea and enhanced the role of Jewish diaspora. During the ensuing Rabbinic period, the Jewish demographic center shifted to Galilee, where the Mishnah was compiled, and later to Babylonia, while smaller Jewish communities persisted across the Mediterranean.

== History ==
=== Persian period (538–332 BCE) ===
Illustrations by Gustav Dore

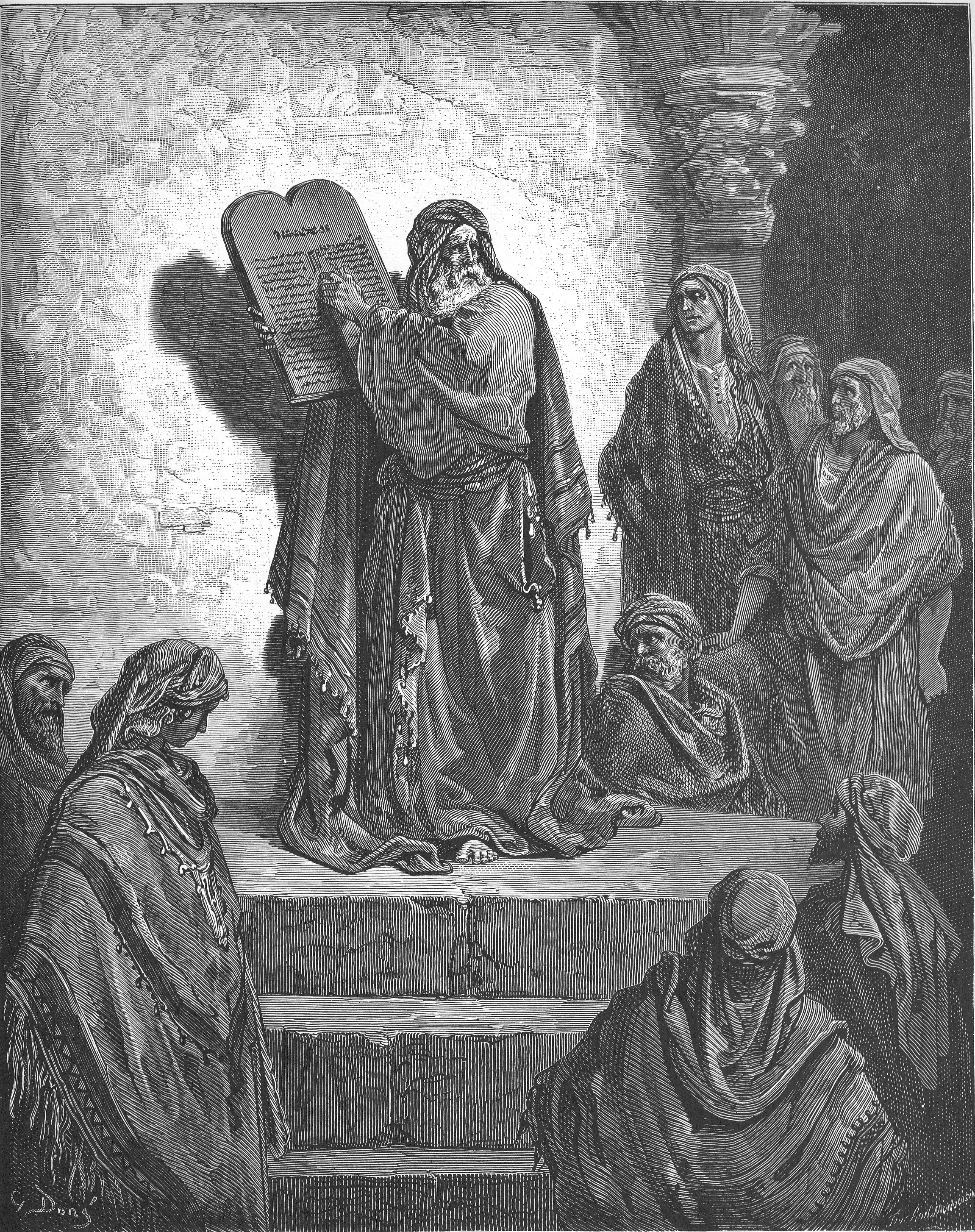
Ezra Reads the Law to the People

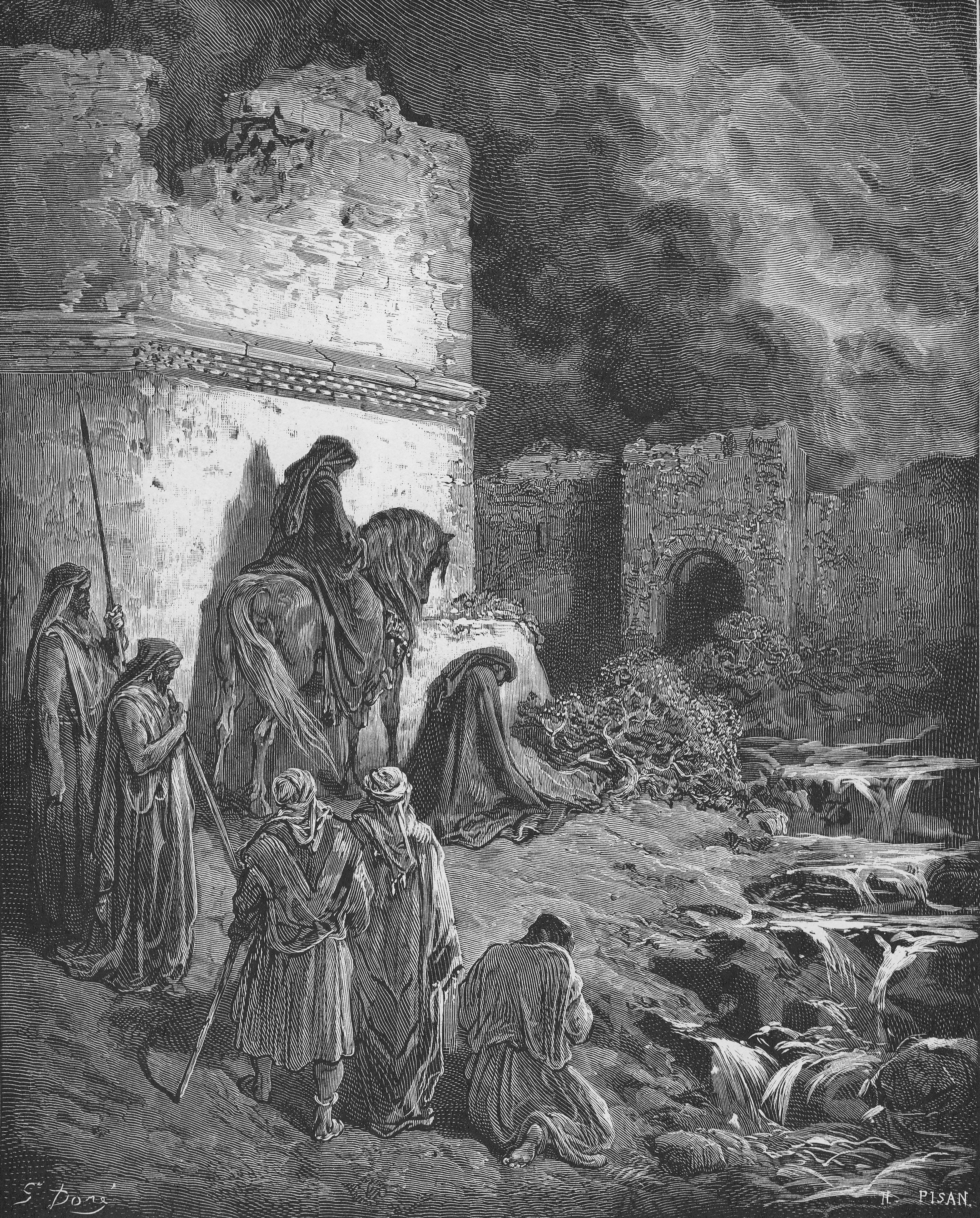
Nehemiah Views the Ruins of Jerusalem's Walls

According to the Book of Ezra, the Persian Cyrus the Great ended the Babylonian exile in 538 BCE, the year after he captured Babylon. The exile ended with the return under Zerubbabel the Prince (so-called because he was a descendant of the royal line of David) and Joshua the Priest (a descendant of the line of the former High Priests of the Temple) and their construction of the Second Temple in the period 521–516 BCE. The Cyrus Cylinder, an ancient tablet on which is written a declaration in the name of Cyrus referring to restoration of temples and repatriation of exiled peoples, has often been taken as corroboration of the authenticity of the biblical decrees attributed to Cyrus, but other scholars point out that the cylinder's text is specific to Babylon and Mesopotamia and makes no mention of Judah or Jerusalem. Professor Lester L. Grabbe asserted that the "alleged decree of Cyrus" regarding Judah, "cannot be considered authentic", but that there was a "general policy of allowing deportees to return and to re-establish cult sites". He also stated that archaeology suggests that the return was a "trickle" taking place over decades, rather than a single event.

The Persians may have experimented initially with ruling Judah as a Davidic client-kingdom under descendants of Jehoiachin, but by the mid–5th century BCE Judah had become in practice a theocracy, ruled by hereditary High Priests and a Persian-appointed governor, frequently Jewish, charged with keeping order and seeing that tribute was paid.

A second group of 5,000, led by Ezra and Nehemiah, returned to Judah in 456 BCE. The first was empowered by the Persian king to enforce the Torah, the second had the status of governor and a royal mission to restore the walls of the city. The Bible mentions tension between the returnees and those who had remained in Judah, the former rebuffing the attempt of the "peoples of the land" to participate in the rebuilding of the Temple; this attitude was based partly on the exclusivism which the exiles had developed while in Babylon and, probably, partly on disputes over property. The careers of Ezra and Nehemiah in the 5th century BCE were thus a kind of religious colonisation in reverse, an attempt by one of the many Jewish factions in Babylon to create a self-segregated, ritually pure society inspired by the prophesies of Ezekiel and his followers.

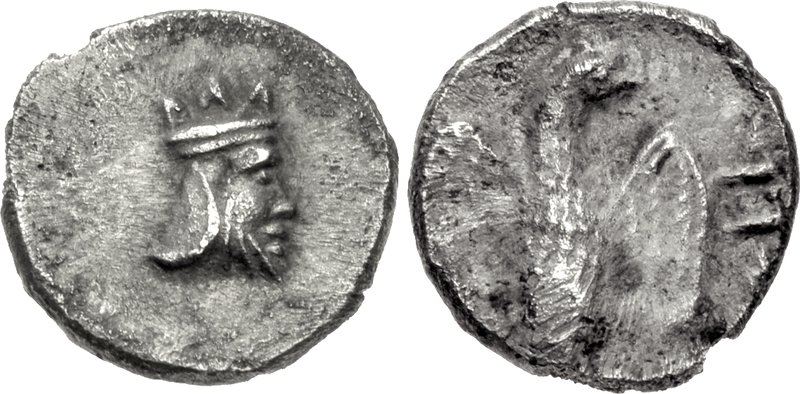
Silver coin (gerah) minted in the Persian province of Yehud, dated c. 375-332 BCE. Obv: Bearded head wearing crown, possibly representing the Persian Great King. Rev: Falcon facing, head right, with wings spread; Paleo-Hebrew YHD to right.

The Persian era, and especially the period between 538 and 400 BCE, laid the foundations for the unified Judaic religion and the beginning of a scriptural canon. The final Torah is widely seen as a product of the Persian period (probably 450–350 BCE). This consensus echoes a traditional Jewish view which gives Ezra a pivotal role in its promulgation. It has been suggested that Darius' reform of the empire's administrative structures, which included the collection, codification, and administration of local law codes, was the driving force behind the Jewish Torah's redaction.

Yehud's population significantly decreased during the Persian era; it is likely that it never exceeded 30,000. This represents a 70% decrease when compared to the late First Temple period. Jerusalem's area was also smaller compared with the late First Temple period. The city shrank to its pre-eighth century BCE size, and its inhabited areas—the City of David and the Temple Mount—had a population of around 1500. Together with the surrounding farms and unwalled settled areas, Jerusalem's population was around 3000 people. The rest of the population lived in small, unwalled towns and villages. The Israel of the Persian period consisted of descendants of the inhabitants of the former Kingdom of Judah, returnees from the Babylonian exile community, Mesopotamians who had joined them or had been exiled themselves to Samaria at a far earlier period, Samaritans, and others.

=== Hellenistic period (333–110 BCE) ===
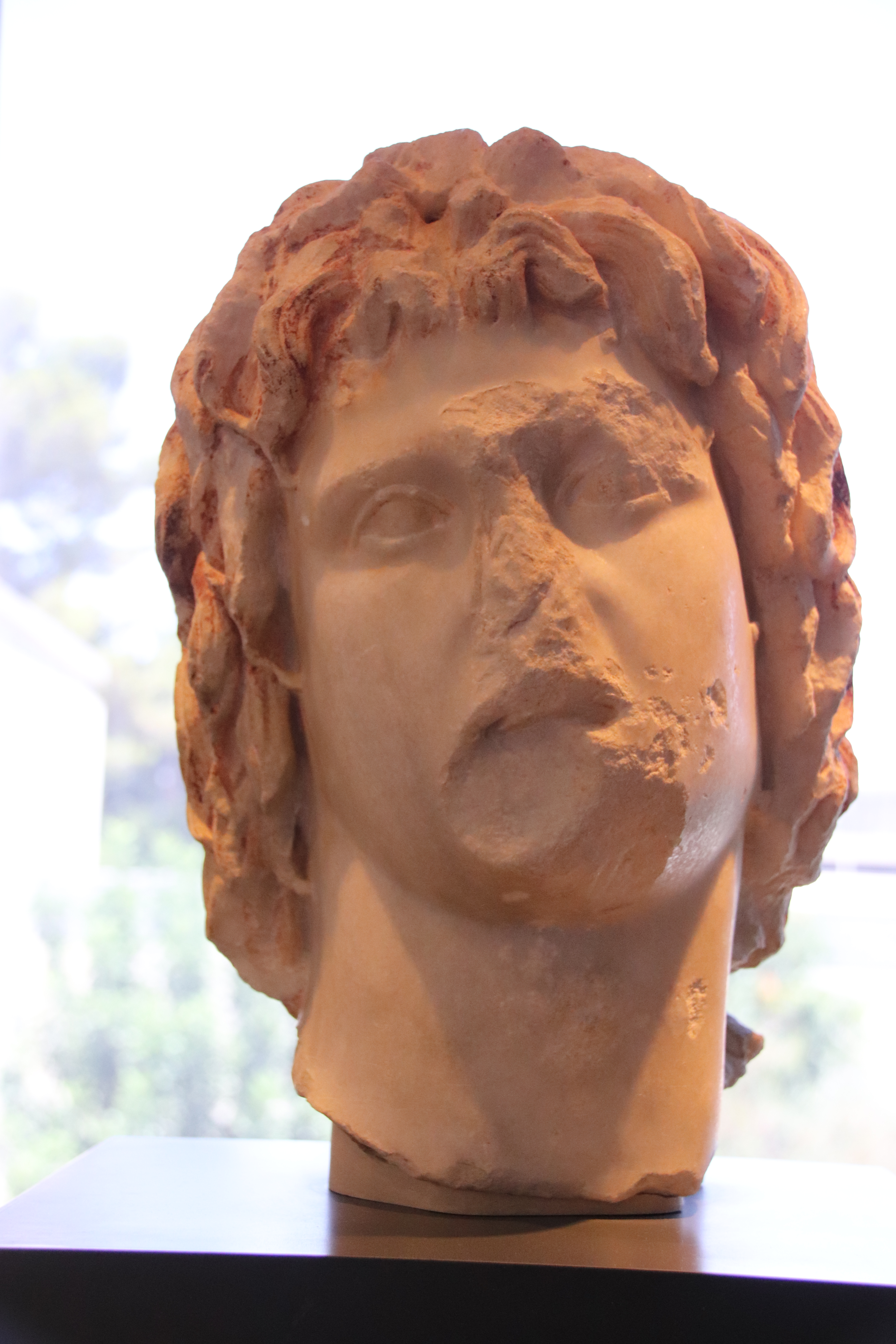
Marble bust of Alexander the Great, discovered in Beit She'an (2nd or 1st century BCE)

In 332 BCE, the region was conquered by Alexander the Great of Macedon, ushering in the Hellenistic period. After his death in 322 BCE, his generals divided the empire and Judea became a frontier region between the Seleucid Empire and Ptolemaic Egypt. Under the Hellenistic kingdoms, Judea was ruled by the hereditary office of the High Priest of Israel as a Hellenistic vassal. At the same time, Hellenism gradually spread to varied degrees on all sides in the region through a variety of contacts, but especially as a result of the development of commerce and the arrival of Greek settlers.

Between 301 and 219 BCE the Ptolemies ruled Judea in relative peace. Jews often found themselves working in the Ptolemaic administration and army, which led to the rise of a Hellenized Jewish elite class (e.g. the Tobiads). This period also saw the rise of a Hellenistic Judaism, which first developed in the Jewish diaspora of Alexandria and Antioch, and then spread to Judea. The major literary product of this cultural syncretism is the Septuagint translation of the Hebrew Bible from Biblical Hebrew and Biblical Aramaic to Koiné Greek. The reason for the production of this translation seems to be that many of the Alexandrian Jews had lost the ability to speak Hebrew and Aramaic.

At the turn of the 2nd-century BCE, a successful military campaign in Coele-Syria led by the Seleucid Antiochus III finally brought the region into the Seleucid empire, with Jerusalem falling under his control in 198 BCE. The Seleucids, like the Ptolemies before them, held a suzerainty over Judea: they respected Jewish culture and protected Jewish institutions.

This policy was drastically reversed by Antiochus IV, possibly due to a dispute over leadership of the Temple in Jerusalem and the office of High Priest or a revolt whose nature was lost to time. Antiochus IV issued decrees forbidding many traditional Jewish practices and began a campaign of persecution against devout Jews. This triggered a revolt against his rule, the Maccabean Revolt. These decrees were a departure from typical Seleucid practice, which did not attempt to suppress local religions in their empire. Scholars of Second Temple Judaism sometimes refer to Antiochus' reign as the 'Antiochene crises', and as a period of civil war between Hellenized and orthodox forms of Judaism.

==== Maccabean Revolt (167–140 BCE) ====
According to 1 Maccabees, 2 Maccabees, and Josephus, the Seleucid Emperor Antiochus IV (r. 175–164) moved to assert strict control over the Seleucid satrapy of Coele Syria and Phoenicia after his successful invasion of Ptolemaic Egypt (170 to 168 BCE) was turned back by the intervention of the Roman Republic. He sacked Jerusalem and the Temple, suppressing Jewish and Samaritan religious and cultural observances, and imposed Hellenistic practices (c. 168-167 BCE).

Antiochus' actions enraged the elites but also the rural population, who had remained mostly untouched by Hellenism. In 167 BCE, Mattathias, a Hasmonean-lineage Jewish priest, killed a Jew in his hometown Modi'in who stepped forward to offer sacrifice to the Greek gods; he then killed a Seleucid official who ordered the sacrifice. According to 1 Maccabees, he declared, "Let everyone who is zealous for the law and supports the covenant come out with me!", and fled with his sons and followers to the wilderness of Judea. These events signaled the start of the Maccabean Revolt.

When Mattathias died, his son Judas Maccabeus took over as leader of the revolt. He used guerrilla tactics to defeat several small Seleucid armies while Antiochus IV was fighting a war in the east. The conflict was heavily religiously charged because, in order to distinguish themselves from their Jewish opponents, the Maccabees presented themselves as radical Jews and carried out large-scale forced circumcisions. Judas eventually succeeded in capturing Jerusalem and purifying the allegedly desecrated temple. This event is commemorated by the Jewish festival of Hannukkah.

The Maccabean cause was aided further in 164 BCE when Antiochus IV died and his generals fought over guardianship of his young son Antiochus V; this turmoil ended when Antiochus IV's nephew, Demetrios I, returned from exile in Rome, deposed Antiochus V, and ascended to the Seleucid throne. Demetrios continued the war against the Maccabees and backed their Jewish opponents. Around this time Judas was able to make a treaty with the Romans. Around 161 BCE, a Roman–Jewish Treaty was signed. In 160 BCE, the Seleucid general Bacchides defeated the Maccabees at the Battle of Elasa in 160 BCE; Judas' death during the battle dealt a blow to the rebels.

After Judas died, his brother Jonathan Apphus took over as the leader of the revolt. He benefited from another internal Seleucid struggle between King Demetrius I Soter and an usurper, Alexander Balas. Both turned to Jonathan, attempting to win him over with concessions, and Alexander Balas even elevated him to the position of high priest. Alexander Balas was eventually able to assert himself, but he was quickly defeated by Demetrios' son Demetrios II. The battle for the throne was now between him and the general Diodotos Tryphon, which strengthened Jonathan's position even more. This did not change when Tryphon was able to capture and murder Jonathan in Acre through treachery.

In 142 BCE, Simon Thassi, the last of Mattathias' sons, took over as rebellion leader and high priest. He was eventually successful in destroying the Acra, a fortified complex in Jerusalem that was the last symbol of Seleucid rule in Judea.

==== Hasmonean period (140–63 BCE) ====
After Simon was assassinated and replaced by his son John Hyrcanus I (r. 134–104 BCE), Antiochus VII led a large army into Judea, forcing Hyrcanus to surrender as a vassal ruler in Jerusalem after a two-year siege. However, following Antiochus' death in the Seleucid-Parthian Wars in 129 BCE, the Seleucids were soon too weak to pursue an active policy outside of Syria; Hyrcanus was relieved of his burden, establishing the now de facto independent Hasmonean state of Judea, minting coins for the first time, and doubling the state's territory.

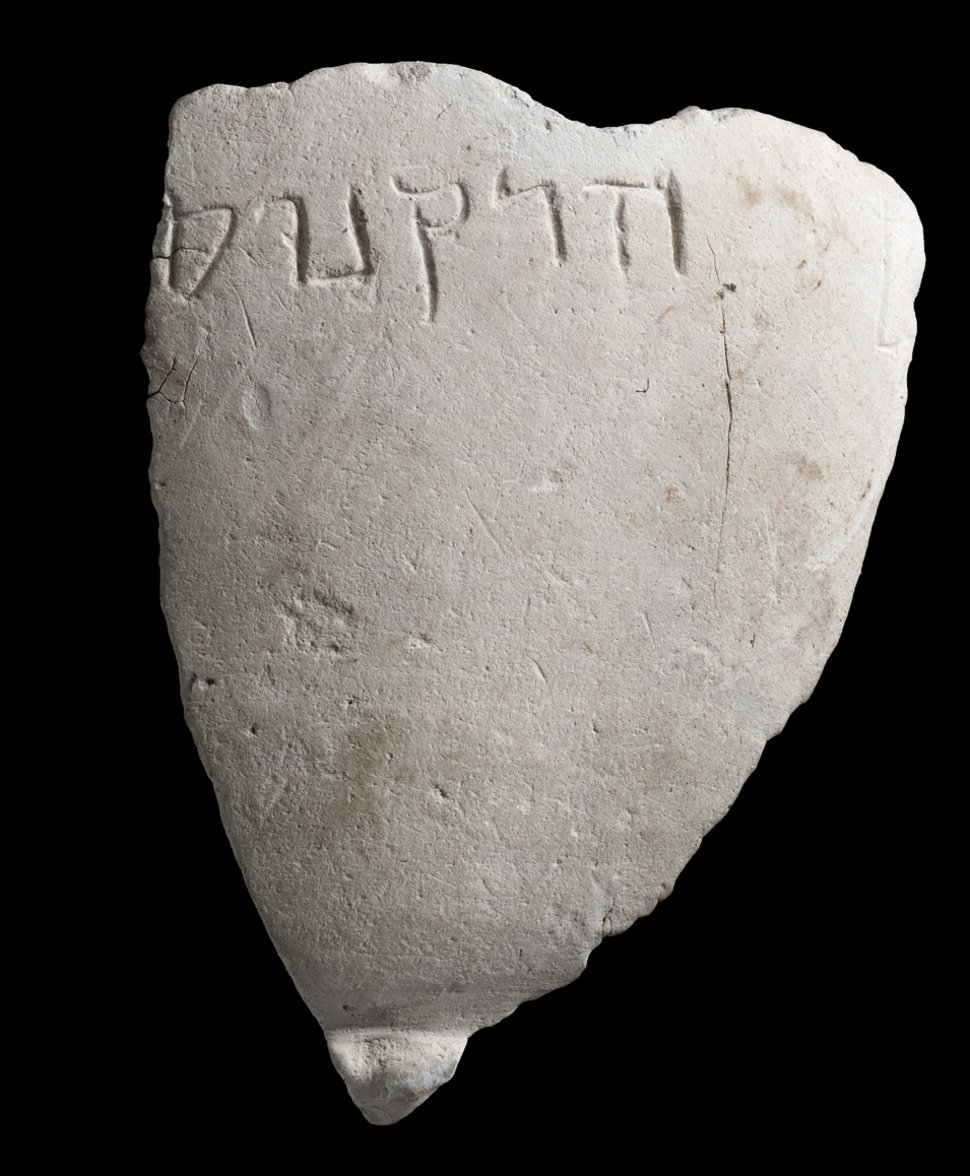
Stone bowl fragment with the name “Hyrcanus,” which was discovered in the Givati Parking Lot, Jerusalem

Around 110 BCE, Hyrcanus launched an invasion of Transjordan. His army laid siege to the city of Medeba and took it after a six-month siege. After this victory, he turned north and invaded Samaria, which had long separated Judea from Jewish settlements in Galilee. Shechem was reduced to a village and the Samaritan Temple on Mount Gerizim was destroyed. Archaeological evidence places these events between 111 and 110 BCE. Hyrcanus also launched a military campaign in Idumea, capturing Marisa and Adora. The Idumeans were forced to convert to Judaism, by threat of exile or death, depending on the source.

Following the death of Hyrcanus, his son Aristobulus I (r. 104–103 BCE) assumed the title of king for the first time and combined it with the office of high priest. People were now more open to Hellenistic influences that had been demonized as un-Jewish during the war; the Hasmonean kingship bore clear Hellenistic monarchy traits, but combined these with theocratic elements. Aristobulus conquered and annexed Galilee. The Galilee, which had previously been sparsely inhabited, mostly by pagan populations, but also by Jewish communities, experienced an influx of Jewish settlement following these conquests. Josephus writes that he had also subjugated and Judaized Iturea, but this claim is not supported by archeological evidence.

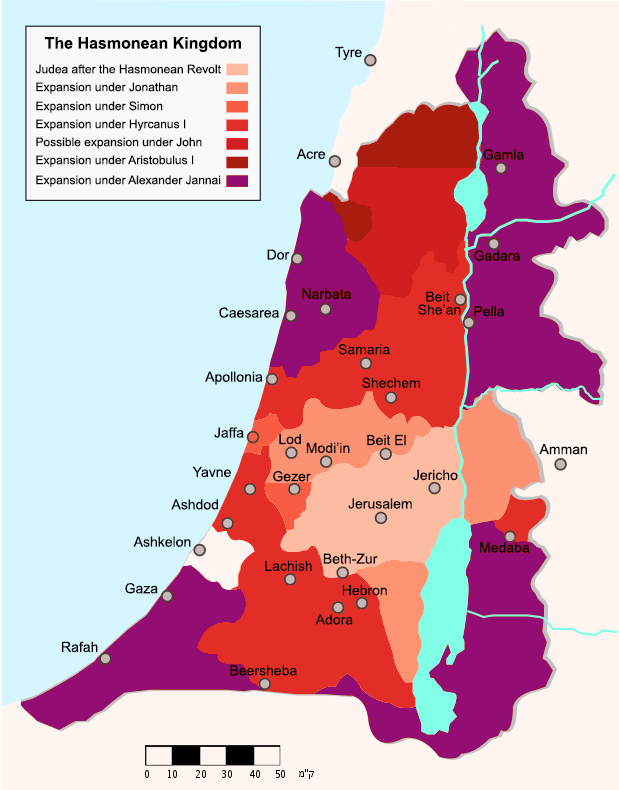
Map of the Hasmonean kingdom

Alexander Jannaeus (r. 103–76 BCE) waged a series of expansionist wars, primarily against the Hellenistic cities surrounding Judea. Unlike his predecessors, who were focused on the concentration of the Jewish population in one country, his military efforts were motivated by a desire to control key economic points such as ports and trade routes. On the same time, he carried on his predecessors' conversion policy, and destroyed Pella because its inhabitants refused to convert. During his reign, the Hasmonean kingdom expanded to its greatest extent, now including the coastal plain, the northern Negev, and western parts of Transjordan. Jannaeus' dual role as king and high priest, his inclination towards the Sadducees, the high cost of the wars in both money and lives threatened the governmental balance and sparked opposition to his rule, resulting in the Judean Civil War, which Jannaeus brutally suppressed.

Salome Alexandra (r. 76–67 BCE), Jannaeus' widow, ascended to power following her husband's death. Under her rule, the priesthood was separated from the other powers of government for the first time since the rise of the Hasmoneans. Salome appointed her son, Hyrcanus II, as high priest and his brother, Aristobulus II, as army commander, and pursued a moderate, mostly defensive policy that included the formation of a large and deterring army. Her nine-year reign is described as one of peace and economic prosperity, during which the country recovered from wars. The queen clearly supported the Pharisees, even allowing them to persecute and punish the Sadducees. Her rule had a distinct Hellenistic flavor, as there was no tradition of female rule in Judea.

Hasmonean kings attempted to revive the Judah described in the Bible: a Jewish monarchy ruled from Jerusalem and including all territories once ruled by David and Solomon. In order to carry out this project, the Hasmoneans forcibly converted neighbor nations to Judaism. Some scholars argue that the Hasmonean dynasty institutionalized the final Jewish biblical canon.

==== Hasmonean civil war ====
After Salome Alexander died in 67 BCE, Hyrcanus II, her older son, was entitled to assume the throne and was already acting as high priest. However, Aristobulus II, her younger son, was more energetic and determined to become king. Aristobulus gathered an army to attack Jerusalem, forcing Hyrcanus to abdicate the crown. The abdication was formally carried out in the temple, and Aristobulus' son, Alexander, married Hyrcanus' daughter, Alexandra. However, Antipater, an Edomite noble who served as Hyrcanus' advisor, convinced him that giving up the throne was a mistake that needed to be undone. Along with Aretas III, king of the Nabateans, these two formed an alliance and together they attacked and besieged Jerusalem.

During the same period, Roman general Pompey was in the midst of a campaign in the Eastern Mediterranean. After defeating Mithridates VI of Pontus, Pompey conquered the Seleucid Kingdom, which became a Roman province called Syria. The warrying brothers, who saw a mighty army camped near them, appealed to Pompey to decide between them. Three delegations then appeared before Pompey: one sent by Aristobulus, one sent by Hyrcanus, and another from "the people" who demanded to abolish the Hasmonean dynasty, which had transformed the rule of the priests into the rule of kings. Pompey heard the delegations but refrained from deciding. Eventually, in 63 BCE, Pompey invaded Judea, conquered Jerusalem, desecrated the Holy of Holies, imprisoned Aristobulus, and declared Hyrcanus an "ethnarch", a title inferior to the title "king". Judea then became a vassal kingdom of the Roman Republic.

=== Early Roman period (63 BCE–70 CE) ===
After Pompey's conquest of Judea in 63 BCE, Hyrcanus II assumed the role of ethnarch; however, his advisor Antipater was ruler in practice and managed the kingdom's affairs. Some cities which were conquered by the Hasmoneans were removed from Judaean rule, including Azotus, Jaffa and Samaria, as well as Scythopolis and several cities in Transjordan, which formed the semi-autonomous Decapolis.

Hyrcanus II's rule was unstable. Alexander II, Aristobulus II's son, raised a large army and seized Jerusalem, forcing Hyrcanus to leave the city. The Roman general Aulus Gabinius invaded Judea in retaliation, sent Hyrcanus back to Jerusalem, and reinstated him as high priest. When Caesar's civil war broke out, Julius Caesar attempted to install Aristobulus on the throne; however, Aristobulus was poisoned, and his son Alexander, who was preparing to support him, was beheaded at Antioch at the command of Pompey. Antipater and his sons Phasael and Herod gained status and power at the expense of the Hasmonean dynasty's waning power.

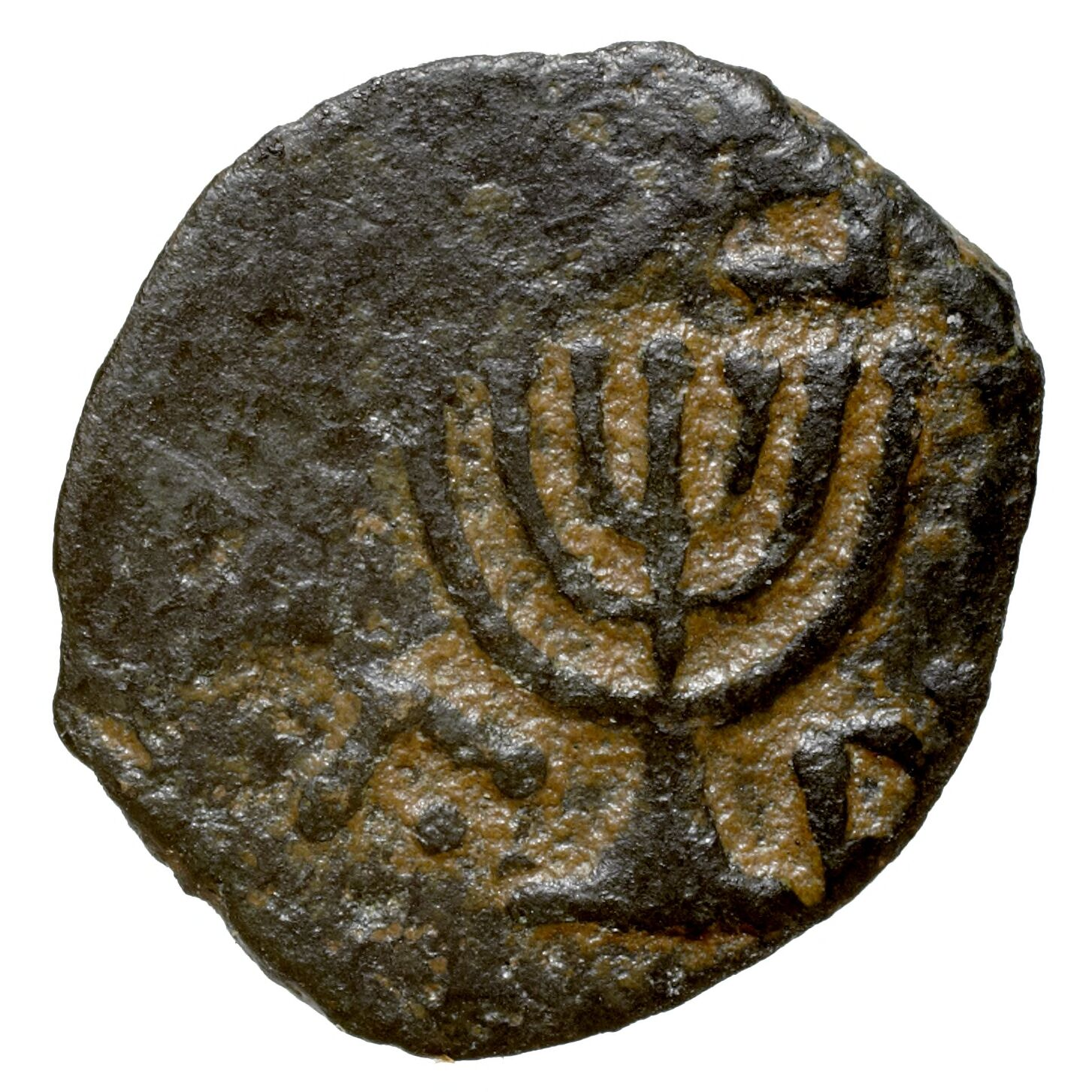
Hasmonean coin of Antigonus II Mattathias, depicting the Temple menorah

When the Parthians invaded the area in 40 BCE, they installed Antigonus II Mattathias, Aristobulus II's youngest son, as king. Phasael committed suicide, and Hyrcanus II was taken as a prisoner to Babylon after having his ear severed in order to prevent him from ever acting as high priest again. Herod, who fled the Parthians, found his way to Mark Antony, who then controlled the eastern part of the Roman Republic. In agreement with his co-ruler Augustus, who controlled the western part, the two decided to appoint Herod as king of Judaea, and sent him with an army to seize the throne. In 37 BCE, Jerusalem was taken after a siege, and Antigonus was captured and executed.

==== Herodian dynasty ====
In 40 BCE, Herod the Great was appointed king of the Jews by the Roman Senate. The kingdom of Judea during his period is also referred to as the Herodian kingdom. As a close and loyal ally to the Romans, Herod extended his rule as far as Arabia and the Hauran. Herod undertook many colossal building projects, including fully rebuilding the Second Temple and expanding the Temple Mount, and founding Caesarea Maritima as a major port city. Herod also constructed the enclosure around the Cave of the Patriarchs in Hebron, the fortress at Masada, and Herodium. The Herodian kingdom under Herod experienced a period of growth and expansion.

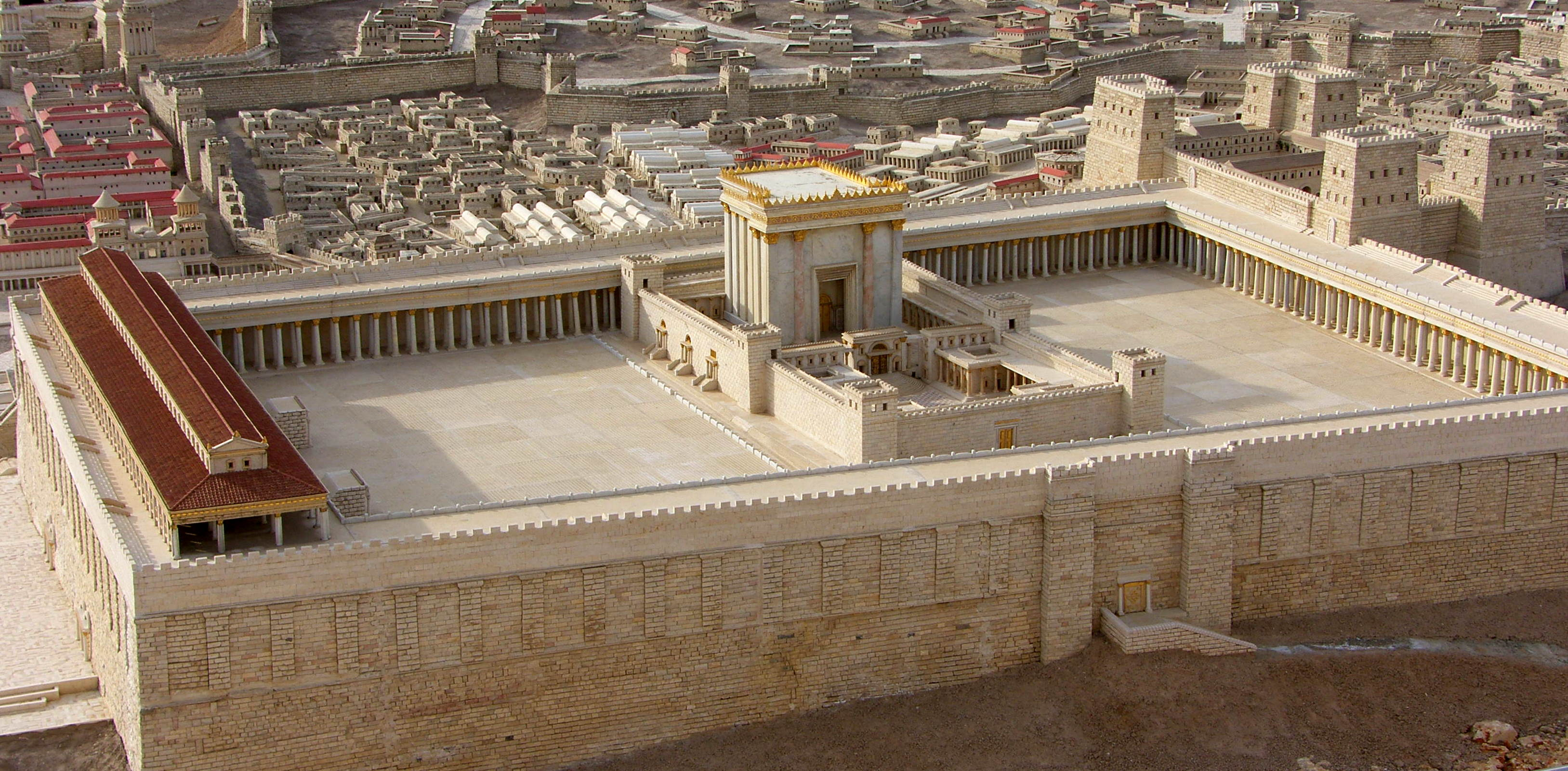
Reconstruction of Herod's Temple in the Holyland Model of Jerusalem

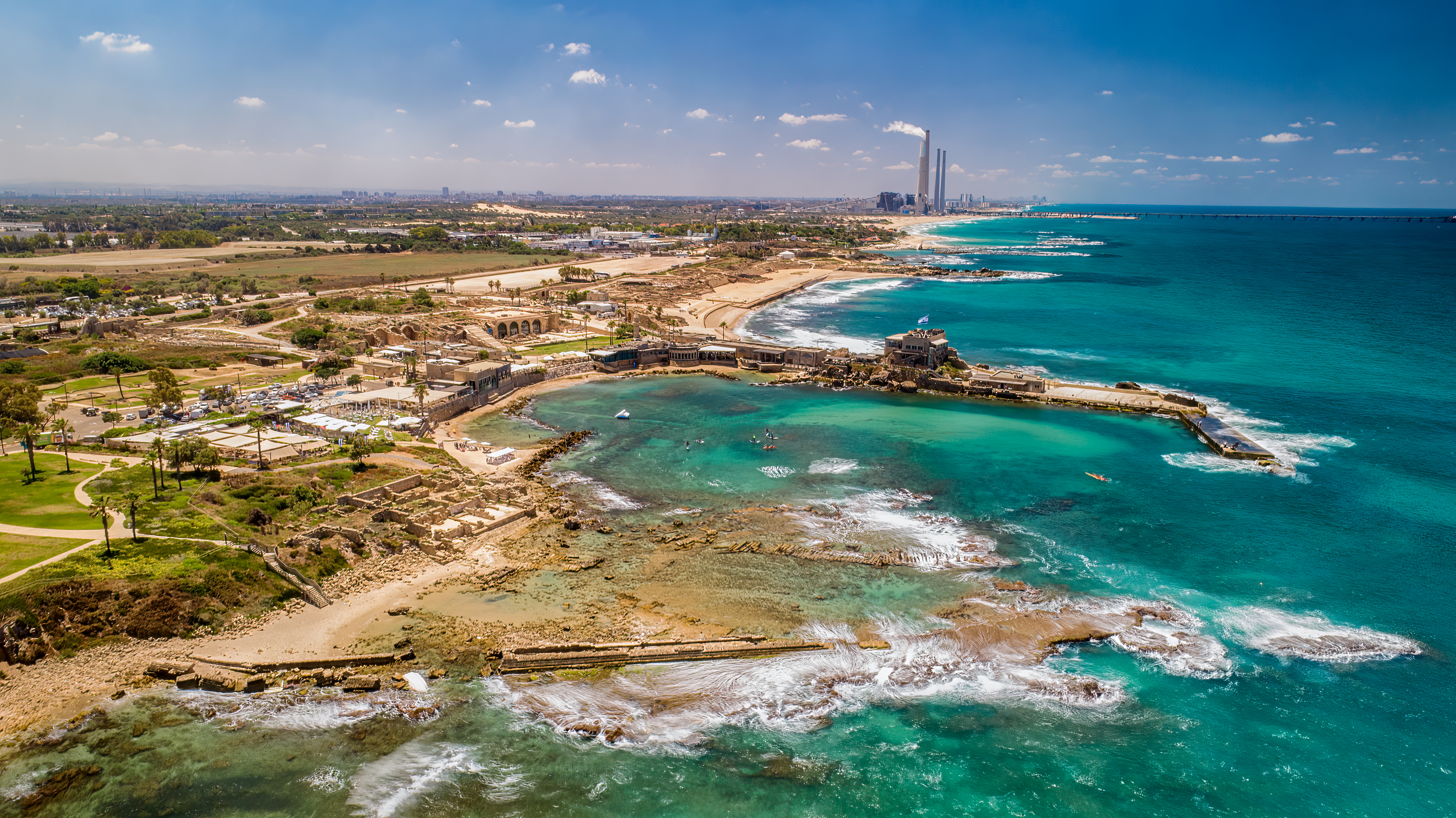
The port of Caesarea Maritima

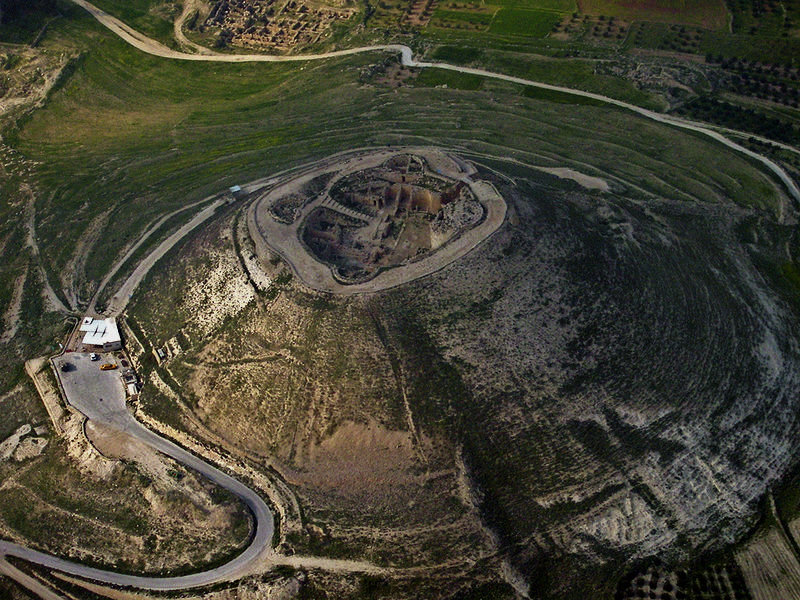
Herodium, a palace fortress built by Herod

After Herod's death in 4 BCE, the kingdom was partitioned to several parts to each of his three sons (initially four parts), forming the Tetrarchy. The central part of the Tetrarchy was given to Herod Archelaus, including Judea proper, Idumea and Samaria. Herod's death in 4 BCE caused the release of built up frustrations of the people who were suppressed by his brutality. Many people were impoverished because of Herod's high taxes and spending. When he died, his building projects that once allowed for job opportunities were stopped, and many people lost their jobs. This built up frustrations that ultimately contributed to the causes of the First Jewish–Roman War.

==== Roman Judaea ====
In 6 CE, the country fell into unrest, and the Herodian ruler of Judea was deposed in favor of forming the new Iudaea Province under direct Roman rule. The Roman province of Judaea extended over parts of the former regions of the Hasmonean and Herodian kingdoms. It was created in 6 CE with the Census of Quirinius and merged into Syria Palaestina after 135 CE.

Jerusalem reached a peak in size and population during the late Second Temple period. The majority of scholars estimate that city's population at that time to have been between 70,000 and 100,000.

Herod II ruled Ituraea and Trachonitis until his death in 34 CE when he was succeeded as tetrarch by Herod Agrippa I, who had previously been ruler of Chalcis. Agrippa surrendered Chalcis to his brother Herod and ruled in Philip's stead. On the death of Herod Antipas in 39 CE Herod Agrippa became ruler of Galilee also, and in 41 CE, as a mark of favour by the Emperor Claudius, succeeded the Roman prefect Marullus as ruler of Judea.

The era from roughly 4 BCE to 33 CE is also notable as being the time period when Jesus of Nazareth should have lived, primarily in Galilee, under the reign of Herod Antipas. It is therefore considered in specifically Jewish history as being when Christianity arose as a messianic sect from within Second Temple Judaism.

==== First Jewish–Roman War ====
In 66 CE, the Jews of Judea rose in revolt against Rome, sparking the First Jewish–Roman War (66-73 CE), also known as the Great Jewish Revolt. Flavius Josephus, a contemporary Jewish historian who fought as the commander of Jewish forces in Galilee but later defected to the Roman side, chronicled the events of the war in his book The Jewish War.

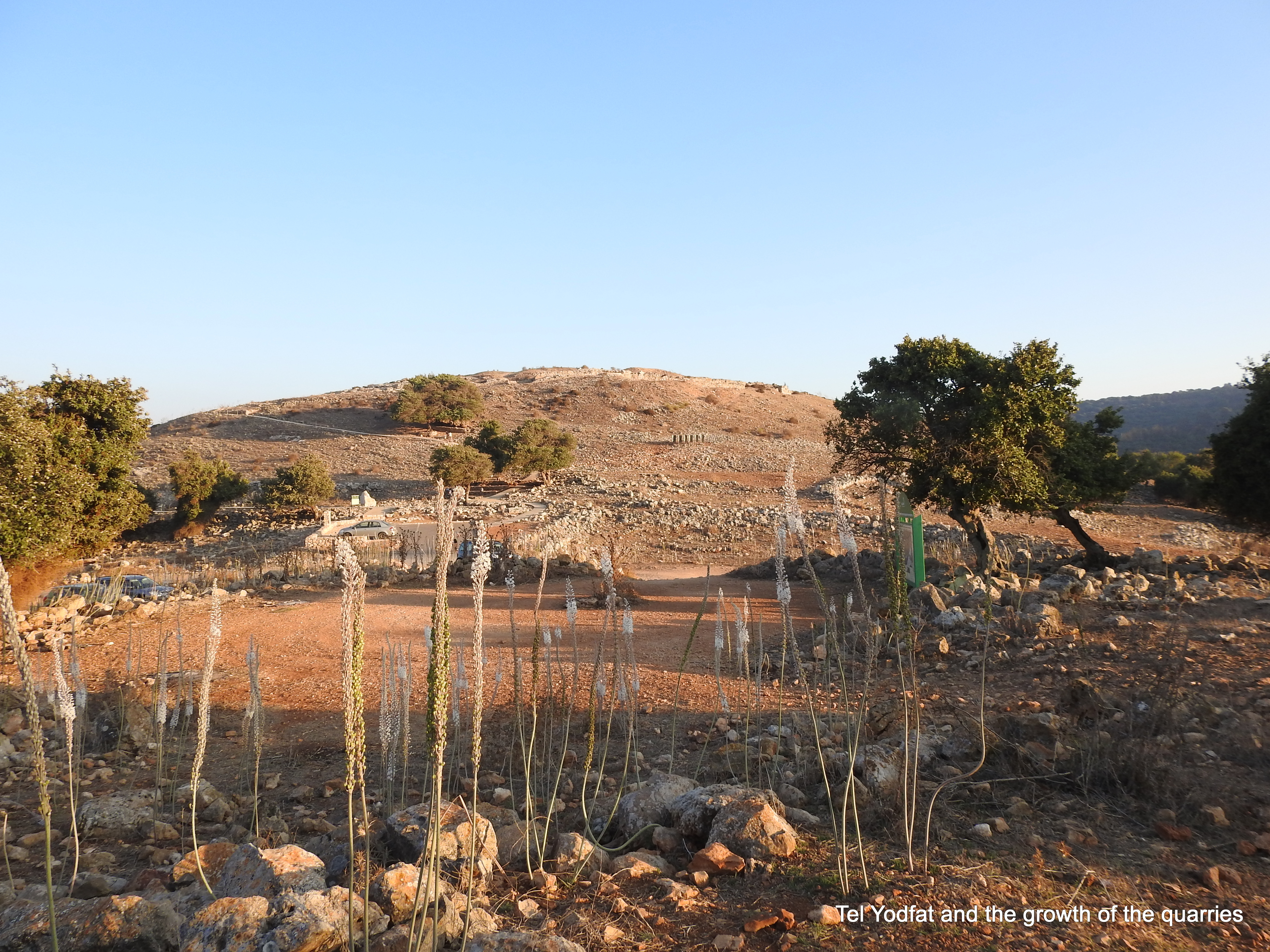
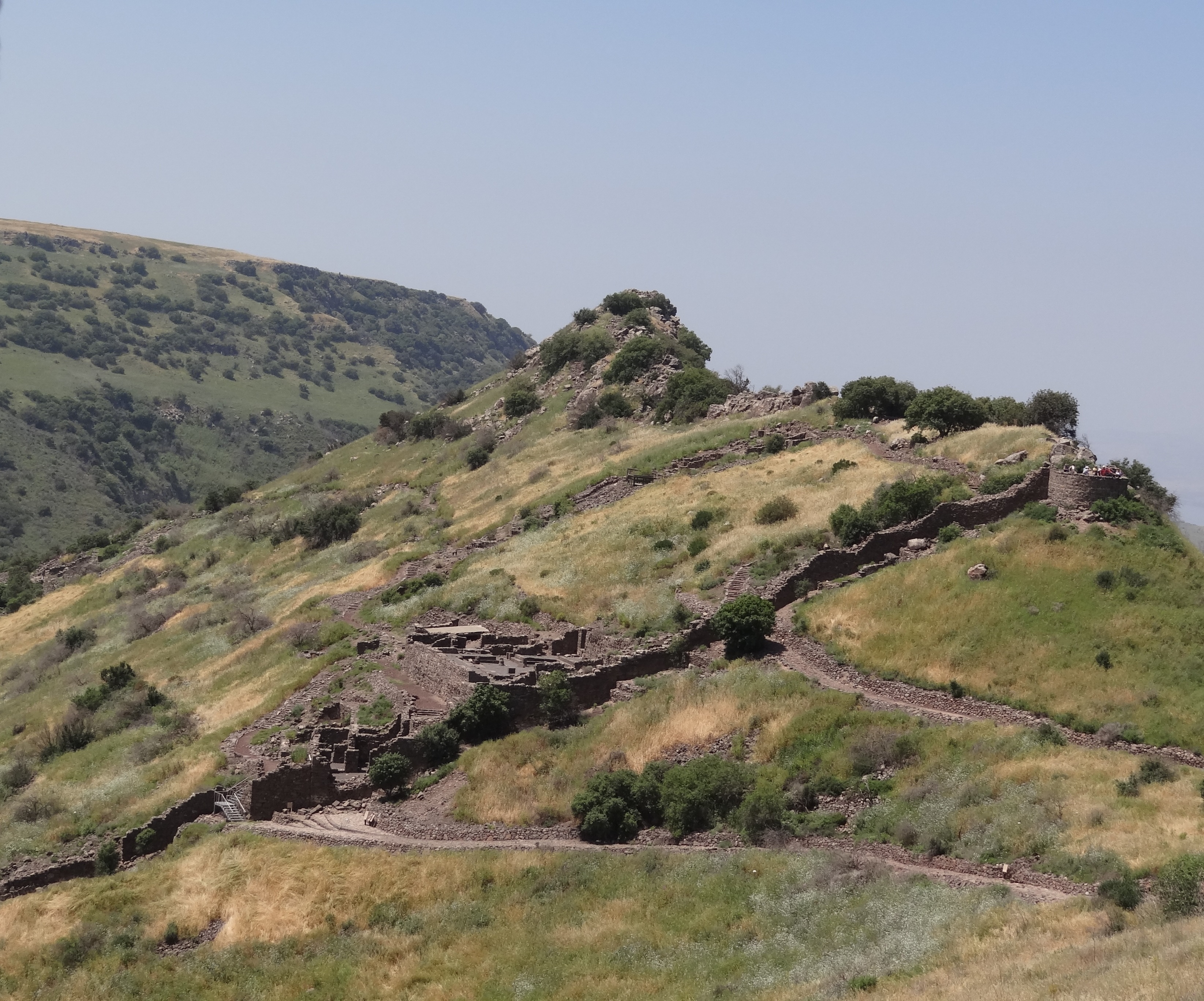
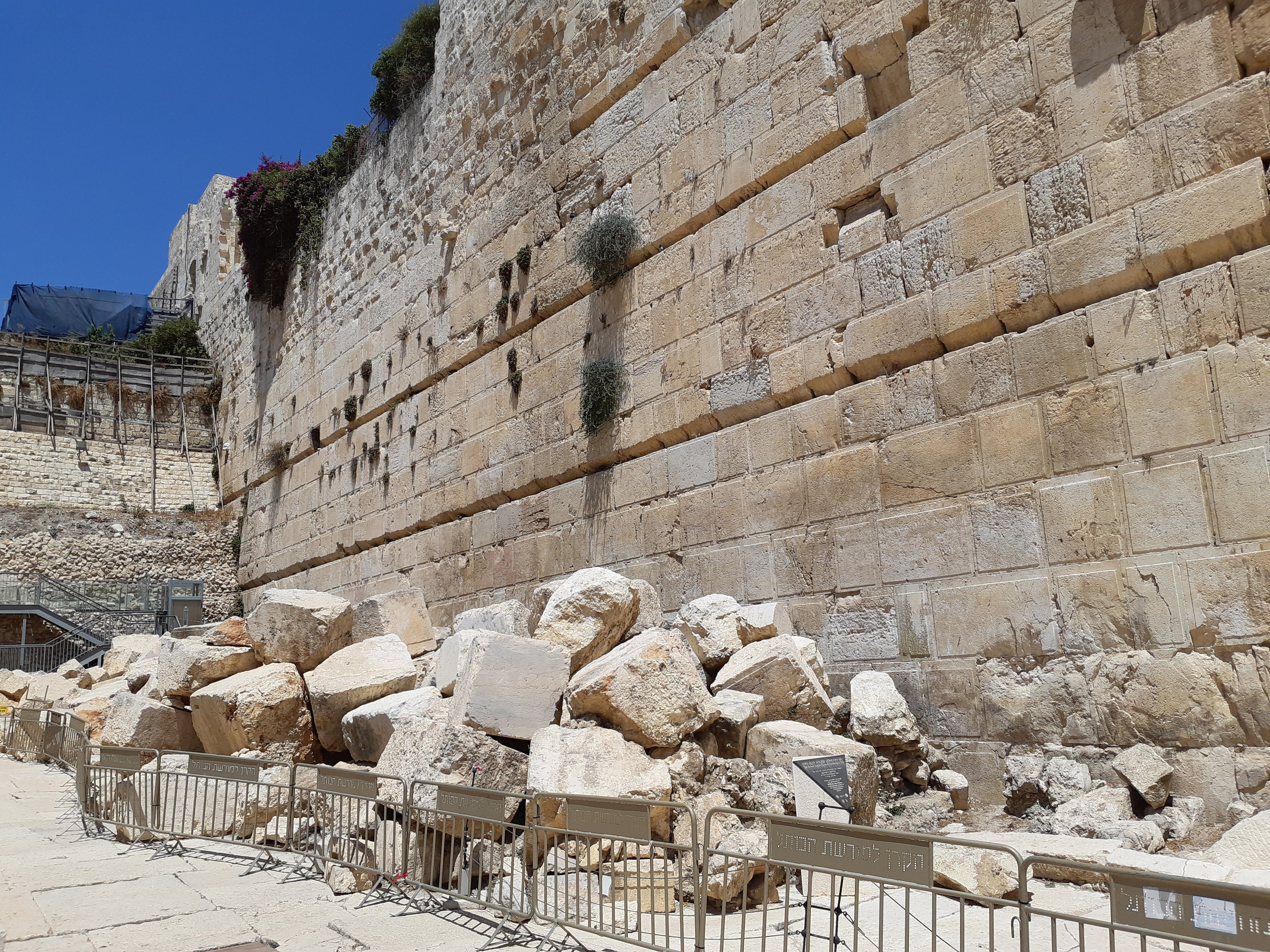
The hill where ancient Yodfat stood (left); the ruins of Gamla (center); stone piles near the Western Wall thought to have been thrown by Roman legionaries during the destruction of the Second Temple (right)

Vespasian, an experienced Roman general, was sent by emperor Nero to crush the rebellion. He arrived at Ptolemais along with legions X Fretensis and V Macedonica. There he was joined by his son Titus, who arrived from Alexandria at the head of Legio XV Apollinaris, as well as by the armies of various local allies including that of king Agrippa II. During the Galilee campaign, many towns surrendered without a fight, and others were taken by force. Yodfat, a fortified town in the Lower Galilee, was besieged for 47 days before it fell to treachery; the city was razed, many people were killed, and the rest were enslaved. Gamla, the major Jewish stronghold in the Golan Heights, fell after a one-month siege. Following a lull in military operations caused by civil war and political turmoil in Rome, Vespasian was summoned to Rome and appointed Emperor.

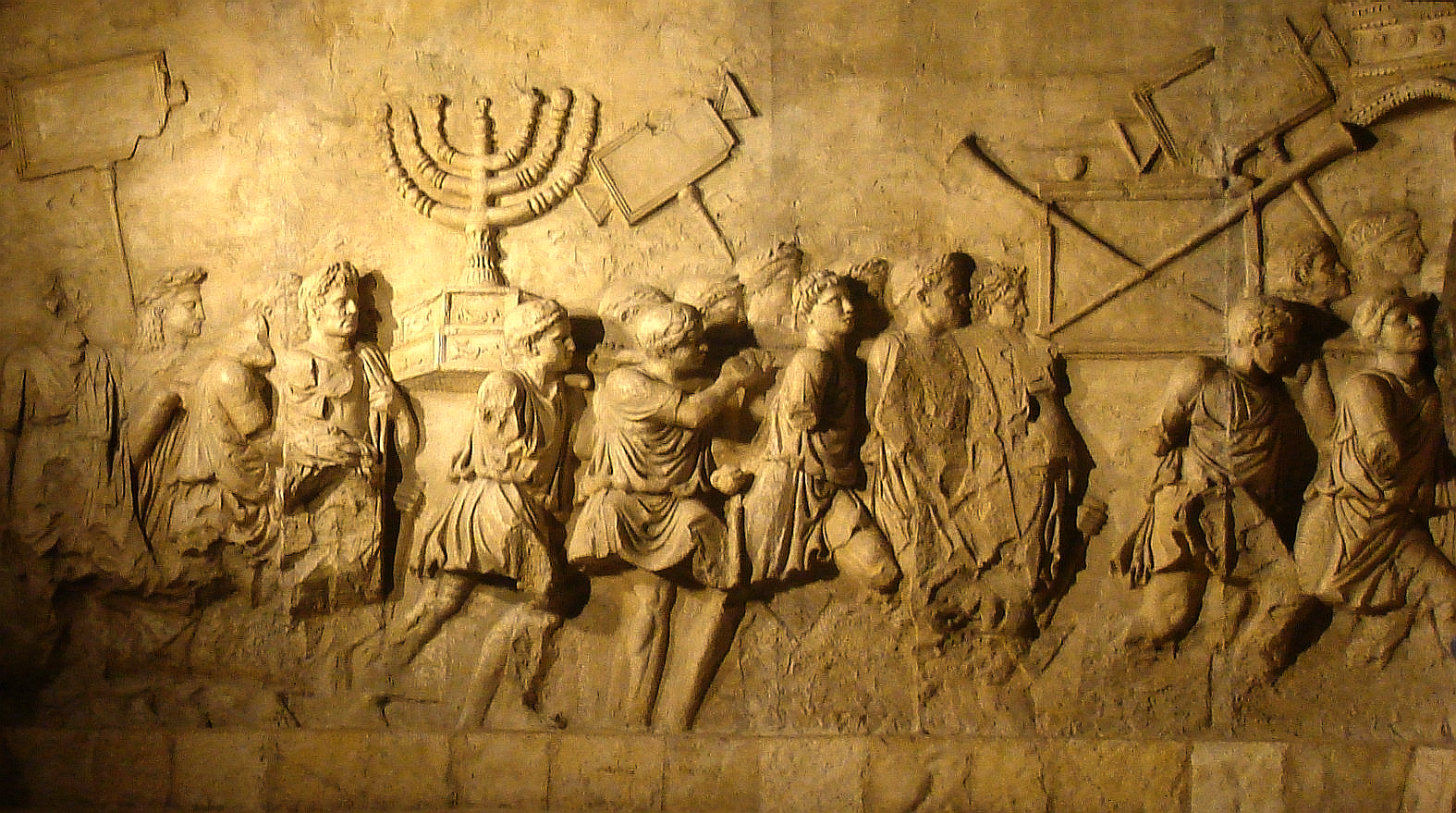
The Arch of Titus in Rome depicts the Roman triumph celebrating the fall of Jerusalem. The procession includes the Menorah and other Second Temple vessels.

In early 70 CE, Titus moved to besiege Jerusalem, the center of rebel resistance in Judaea. The city had been taken over by several rebel factions following a period of massive unrest and the collapse of a short-lived provisional government. The first two walls of Jerusalem were breached in three weeks, but the Roman Army was unable to breach the third and thickest wall due to a stubborn rebel standoff. According to Josephus, a contemporary historian whose work is the main surviving source for information about the war, the city was ravaged by murder, famine, and cannibalism. On Tisha B'Av, 70 CE (August 30), Roman forces finally overwhelmed the defenders and set fire to the Temple. Resistance continued for another month, but eventually the upper and lower parts of the city were taken as well, and the city was burned to the ground. Titus spared only the three towers of the Herodian citadel as a testimony to the city's former might. Josephus wrote that over a million people perished in the siege and the subsequent fighting. While contemporary studies dispute this figure, all agree that the siege had a major toll on human life, with many people being killed and enslaved, and large parts of the city destroyed.

After the fall of Jerusalem, Titus returned to Rome, leaving the remaining Jewish strongholds, including Herodium and Machaerus, to the Roman Legions. The war ended in 73-74 CE with the siege of Masada. According to Josephus, the siege resulted in the mass suicide of the Sicarii rebels and resident Jewish families, though the historicity of the mass suicide is debated.

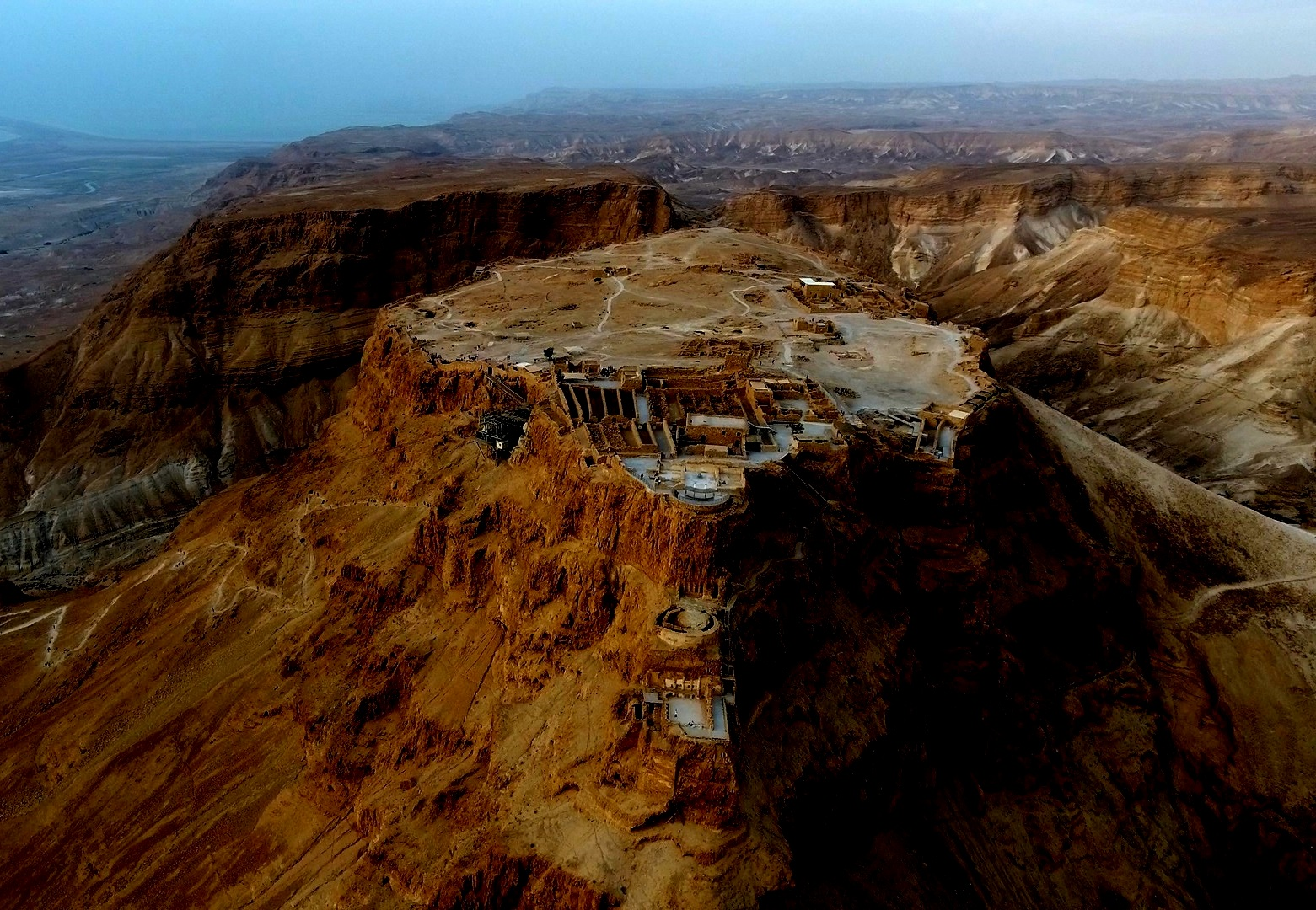
Aerial view of Masada, the last stronghold of the First Jewish-Roman War. The Roman siege ramp appears to the right.

=== Aftermath ===
The failure of the First Jewish Revolt eventually led to two subsequent Jewish uprisings against Rome: the Diaspora Revolt and the Bar Kokhba Revolt in Judaea, both of which ended in catastrophic failure. The Diaspora Revolt, which erupted between 115 and 117 CE, was driven by messianic expectations and the local tensions and violence experienced by Jews in the diaspora. This revolt saw Jewish communities in the Roman provinces of Egypt, Cyrenaica, and Cyprus rise in rebellion, characterized by attacks on local populations, temples, public structures, and roads. The Roman suppression was marked by severe retaliation and ethnic cleansing, involving local populations joining the Roman forces, which led to widespread devastation and the near-total expulsion or annihilation of Jews from these regions.

Two generations after the First Jewish-Roman War, the Bar Kokhba Revolt (132-136 CE) erupted. One reason seems to be the re-establishment of Jerusalem as a Roman colony under the name of Aelia Capitolina. The revolt was brutally suppressed by the Romans and resulted in the extensive depopulation of Judea proper, more so than during the First Jewish–Roman War of 70 CE. Some scholars have described these events as genocide. According to Cassius Dio, 580,000 Jews perished in the war and many more died of hunger and disease, 50 fortresses and 985 villages were destroyed. In addition, many Judean war captives were sold into slavery. Some modern historians assert that Dio's numbers were somewhat exaggerated, but based on the archeological evidence, virtually all scholars support Dio's claim of massive depopulation. The revolt put an end to Jewish aspirations for the reconstruction of Jerusalem and the Temple as well as, more concretely, for Jewish settlement in the district of Judea. The province of Judaea was renamed Syria Palaestina.

Jewish presence in Judaea significantly dwindled after the failure of the Bar Kokhba revolt. Nevertheless, there was a continuous small Jewish presence and Galilee became its religious center. Jewish communities also continued to reside in the southern Hebron Hills and on the coastal plain. The Mishnah and part of the Talmud, central Jewish texts, were composed during the 2nd to 4th centuries CE in Tiberias and Jerusalem. Over the next centuries, more Jews emigrated to flourishing communities in the Diaspora. Others remained in the Land of Israel, and some converted to Christianity. Jewish historians occasionally refers to this time period, which corresponds with the world's late antiquity, as the Rabbinic or Talmudic period.

After the destruction of the Second Temple, Judaism separated into a linguistically Greek and a Hebrew / Aramaic sphere. The theology and religious texts of each community were distinctively different. Hellenized Judaism never developed yeshivas to study the Oral Law. Rabbinic Judaism (centered in the Land of Israel and Babylon) almost entirely ignores the Hellenized Diaspora in its writings. It is unknown whether Hellenized Judaism ultimately vanished as its adherents assmiliated into the Christianized Greco-Roman society, or if it persisted as a distinct, bible-oriented community that later affected the development of Karaite Judaism.

By the first century, the Jewish community in Babylonia, to which Jews were exiled after the Babylonian conquest as well as after the Bar Kokhba revolt in 135 CE, already held a speedily growing population of an estimated one million Jews, which increased to an estimated two million between the years 200 CE and 500 CE, both by natural growth and by immigration of more Jews from the Land of Israel, making up about one-sixth of the world Jewish population at that era.

== Religion ==
During the 600 years of the Second Temple period, multiple religious currents emerged and extensive religious developments occurred. The development of the Hebrew Bible canon, the synagogue, Jewish eschatology can all be traced back to the Second Temple period.

According to Jewish tradition, prophecy ceased during the early Second Temple period; this left the Jewish people without their version of divine guidance at a time when they felt most in need of support and direction.

During the Hellenistic period, currents of Judaism were influenced by Hellenistic philosophy developed from the 3rd century BCE, notably the Jewish diaspora in Alexandria, culminating in the compilation of the Septuagint. An important advocate of the symbiosis of Jewish theology and Hellenistic thought is Philo. The growing influence of Hellenism in Judaism became a source of dissent for some Jews; this was a major catalyst for the Maccabean revolt.

The sects of the Pharisees and Sadducees were formed, according to most scholars, around the mid 2nd century BCE. It is thought that the mystic sect of the Judaean desert, most likely the Essenes, was founded in the second third of the second century BCE. The sect serves as a useful illustration of the profound impact these years had on the emergence of new patterns, beliefs, and lifestyles. The sect members' flight into the desert was a direct protest against what was taking place in Jerusalem at the time. The emergence of a new leadership in the city, a leadership that would shape the course of Jewish history for more than a century, is what led to the cult's estrangement and alienation.

From c. 170 BCE to 30 CE, five successive generations of zugot ("pairs of") leaders headed Jewish spiritual affairs.

A number of messianic ideas developed during the later Second Temple period. Christianity first emerged as a Second Temple Judaic sect in the 1st century Hellenistic Judaism in Roman Judea. Jesus of Nazareth was a first-century Jewish preacher and religious leader. After his death, his apostles and their followers spread around the Levant, Europe, Anatolia, Mesopotamia, the South Caucasus, Egypt, and Ethiopia, despite initial persecution. It soon attracted gentile God-fearers, which led to a departure from Jewish customs, and, after the fall of Jerusalem ended Temple-based Judaism, Christianity slowly separated from Judaism.

=== Literature ===
The religious literature of the Second Temple period can be split into three categories: the Apocrypha and Pseudepigrapha; the literature of the Greek-speaking diaspora; and the Dead Sea Scrolls. The first two categories were preserved by Christians, while the third one was discovered in the 20th century in the Qumran caves.

The Apocrypha ('hidden books') were accepted as canonical scripture by various Christian denominations, and includes books like 1–4 Maccabees, Sirach, Wisdom of Solomon, Baruch (inc. the Letter of Jeremiah), Tobit and Judith, along with 1–2 Esdras and Prayer of Manasseh which are not considered as canonical by any church. The Pseudepigrapha ('false superscription') include books attributed to well-known biblical figures, including Enoch, Abraham, Moses and others. The Dead Sea Scrolls are generally believed to be the library of a mystic sectarian community that lived at Qumran, most likely the Essenes. Together with the works from the first two categories, it also contains other writings including the Community Rule, the Damascus Document, the Temple Scroll, the War Scroll, the Thanksgiving Hymns, the pesharim, and others.

A fourth category would be some parts of the Hebrew Bible that were composed during the Second Temple period, including the prophetic books of Zechariah, Haggai, Malachi, Joel, and parts of Isaiah (24–7, 56–66), all dating from the Persian period, along extensive portions of the Ketuvim. However, these books are not typically included in scholarship as part of the Second Temple period literature.

== Economy ==
=== Agriculture ===
Almost all of the national Jewish economy's needs during the Second Temple period were met domestically; there was very little exporting or importing. Agriculture played a significant role in economic life. Josephus explains why earlier texts did not mention Jews by stating that:

As for ourselves, therefore, we neither inhabit a maritime country, nor do we delight in merchandise, nor in such a mixture with other men as arises from it; but the cities we dwell in are remote from the sea, and having a fruitful country for our habitation, we take pains in cultivating that only.

It is believed that the majority of Judaea's farmland was used to grow grain, predominantly wheat but also hardier but less popular barley in drier areas. Archaeologists have found numerous olive and winepresses, indicating the importance of these products as well. Rabbinic literature, Josephus' writings, and the New Testament further reveal that herbs, garden vegetables, and legumes were also grown. Legumes were especially important, because they could be stored for a long time and frequently flourished in years when other crops failed. Sources from the late first and early second centuries CE indicate that rice was introduced to Palestine by Jewish farmers during the early Roman period. The local crop was fine, large-kernel rice.

The main products of livestock were milk, butter, and cheese (albeit these foods made up a small portion of the diet), wool, and food for the Roman army, whose diet, unusually for the time period, included a daily ration of meat. There was also fish, probably generally pickled, though not in great quantities. The Galilean city of Tarichaeae, located along the shore of the Sea of Galilee, got its name from Greek: ταρίχη, "pickled fish".

A few small areas in the province dedicated to the cultivation of cash crops. A famous example is the balsam plantations around Jericho. Josephus also indicates that in his day, the olive was extensively grown in some parts of Upper Galilee, and that its oil was occasionally sold to neighboring cities.

=== Import and export ===
There are several sources that do suggest there may have been a limited amount of importing. Wheat imports are mentioned in Makhshirin 3:4, and the rabbis' ruling that imported pottery and glass were ritually impure also seems to suggest that these products were brought into the region. The Hellenistic-period Hefzibah inscription demonstrates that there was some exchange of goods among the local communities, and there may have even been some export. it is also possible that the area served as a form of commerce enclave, as balsam and dates from the Jericho area were sold outside the area and it is obvious that the locals there were not self-sufficient in other ways.

But, when looking at the overall economic picture, the scale of imports and exports was insignificant. For instance, the Romans imposed a yearly land tax and harbor tax on Hyrcanus in the sum of 20,665 modia, or around 135.5 tons of wheat for Joppa. A levy of 135.5 tons of wheat was absurdly low considering Joppa was the main Jewish port, indicating that the city only exported a little amount of goods. According to Josephus, the main commercial hubs were the Phoenician coastal cities. They took part in international trade in the Mediterranean sea and reportedly served as the main ports for the Land of Israel's meager import and export requirements. Some of those cities were conquered by the Hasmoneans, while they may not have been completely abandoned, their economic situation and prestige degraded. During this period, only Ascalon remained an independent city, and Joppa continued to function as a small harbor city. The Phoenician coastal cities prospered once more and resumed their status as economic hubs after the Romans seized Palestine.

Importing food was important at times of drought or famine, as it was during the time of Herod, and Helena. Nonetheless, as is evident from the Testament of Job, trading at this time was often a characteristic of the coastal cities.

=== Goods ===
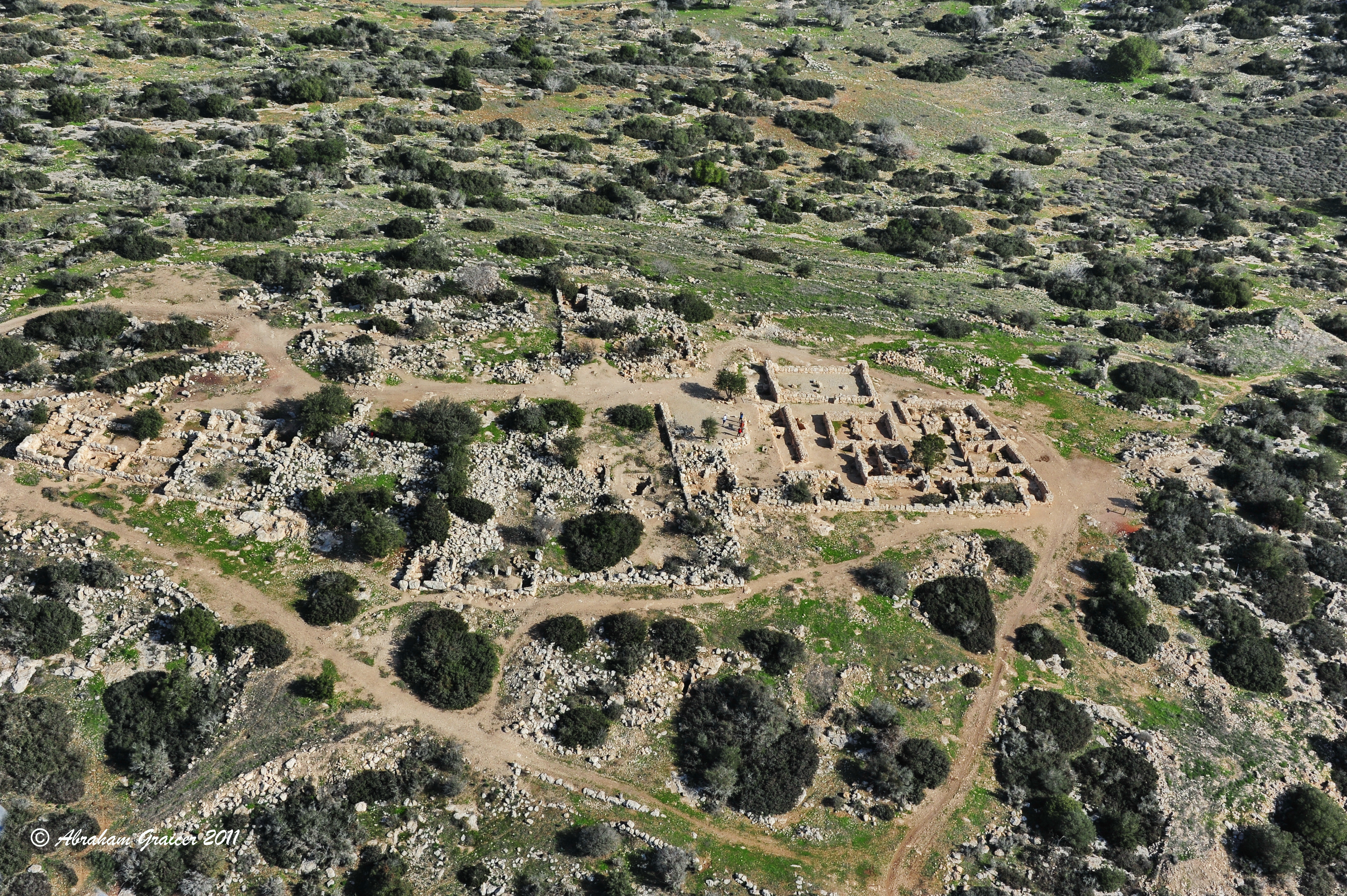
Hurvat Itri, a partially reconstructed village of the Second Temple period

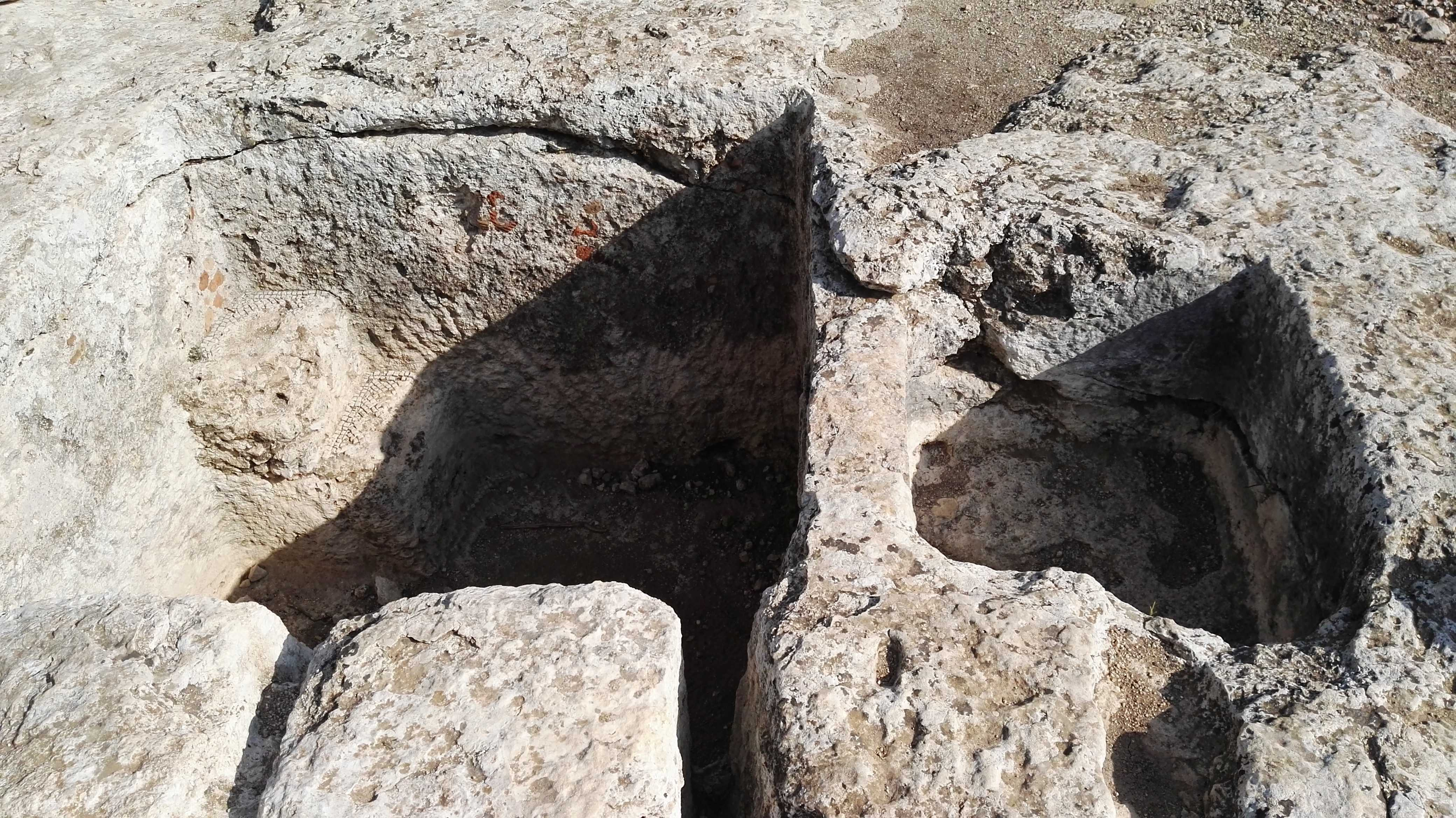
A rock-cut wine press at Hurvat Itri

Jerusalem during the late Second Temple period was a significant center of consumption at this time. This economic center developed to meet the needs of both the Temple and pilgrims, as well as those of the locals who did not work in agriculture. Doves were raised in the Judean Lowlands and sent to the Temple.

The locations from which the Temple received high-quality agricultural items are listed in the Mishnah's Menachot tractate. The highest quality fine flour was transported from farms in Michmas and Zonicha (now Zanoah). The Aforayim flour came in second. Olive trees near Teqoa of Galilee served as the Temple's main source of olive oil. Regev in the Transjordan came in second. Qerouthim (Keruthim) and Hatoulim were the main producers of wine, followed by Beit Rima (now Bani Zeid al-Gharbia), Beit Lavan (now al-Lubban al-Gharbi), and Kefar Signa (in the lower Galilee).

=== Overview ===
Judea's linguistic situation during the Second Temple period is defined by the co-existence of two spoken languages: Aramaic and Hebrew. The meaning of the population's bilingualism is debated; opinions differ on whether speakers express themselves equally in Hebrew or Aramaic, or whether one language is preferred over the other depending on region. Aramaic became widely spoken in Samaria and Galilee, while Judea continued to use Hebrew. Although Aramaic had eventually surpassed Hebrew as the most widely spoken language in the region, many people learned Hebrew as a liturgical language.

During the two centuries of Persian rule (538–332 BCE), the administrative language was Imperial Aramaic. Beginning in 333 BCE, Koine Greek became the official language of administration and was used to spread Hellenistic culture. Even under Roman rule, the administrative language in the eastern provinces, including Judaea, remained Greek.

The square script (also known as Ktav Ashuri) had probably already started to replace the paleo-Hebrew script during the Persian period, though the transition was not complete until the Hellenistic period and traces of the previous script were still in use until the Bar-Kokhba revolt.

Latin, the language of the Roman army and higher levels of administration, had almost no impact on the linguistic landscape. It is less common in texts and archaeology. Only a few Latin papyri were discovered in the region; those discovered at Masada belonged to the Roman garrison.

=== Aramaic ===
During the Persian period, Aramaic was the civil administration language. The contract texts were written in Aramaic. The ketubah (marriage contract), get (divorce certificate), and other legal documents mentioned in the Talmud are written in Aramaic. The formulas for the Aramaic texts of the ketubot have been preserved since the Persian period, even though they were modified during the Hellenistic period. Elephantine's Jewish community has adopted Aramaic, and it was the main language used in the Elephantine papyri and ostraca. Jesus, a native of the Galilee, and his disciples spoke Aramaic.

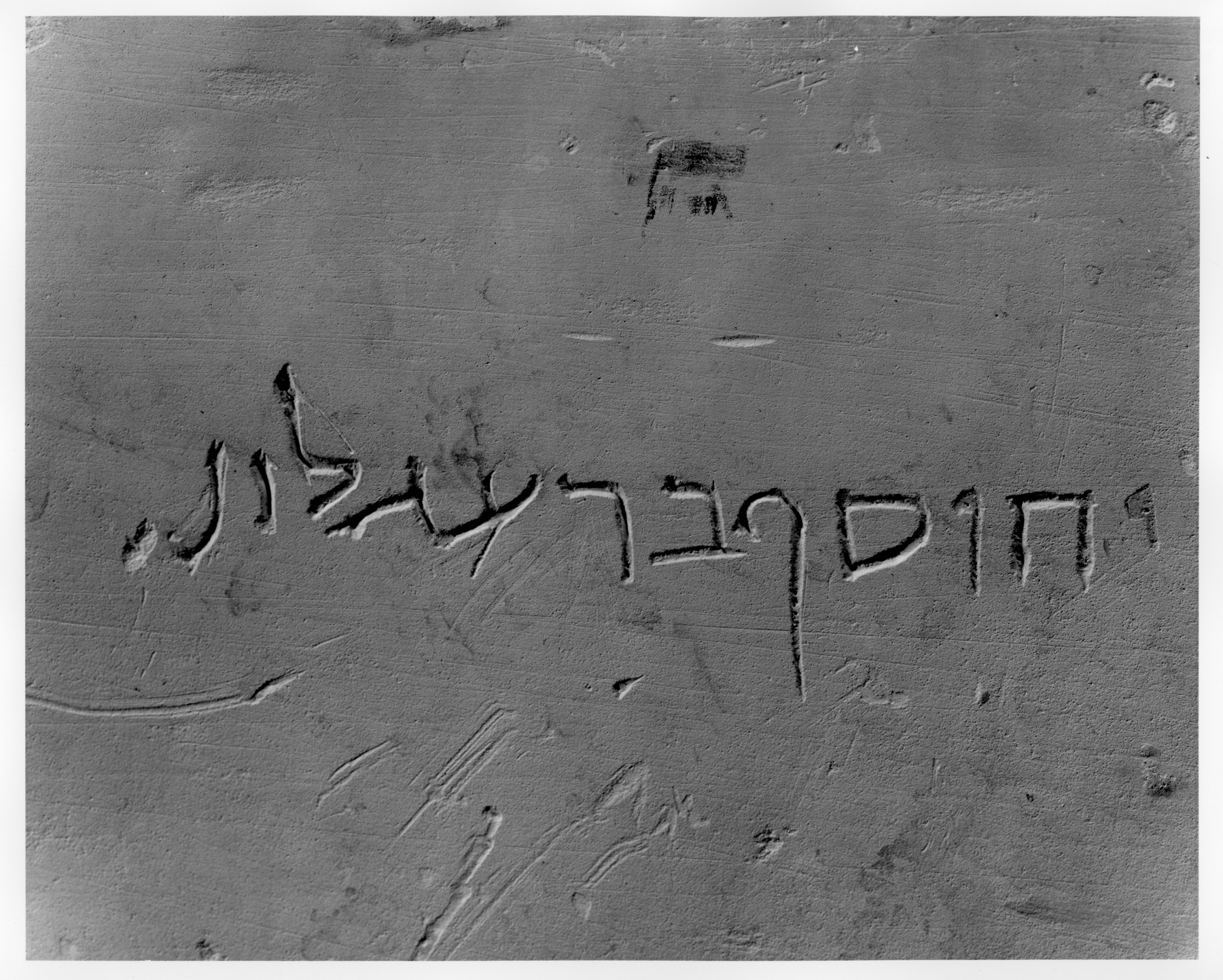
Funerary inscription in Aramaic: "Yehosef bar Aglon"

Despite the fact that Aramaic has become the most widely spoken language, there are few Aramaic texts that provide information on the language spoken in the region during the Second Temple period. Three books of the Hebrew Bible contain passages in Aramaic: Ezra 4:8 to 6:18 and 7:12 to 26 and Daniel 2:4 to 7:28. The Megillat Ta'anit ("The Scroll of Fasting") was written in Aramaic around the first century CE. This is also true of the targumim, or Aramaic paraphrases of the Bible, but dating them is difficult.

=== Hebrew ===
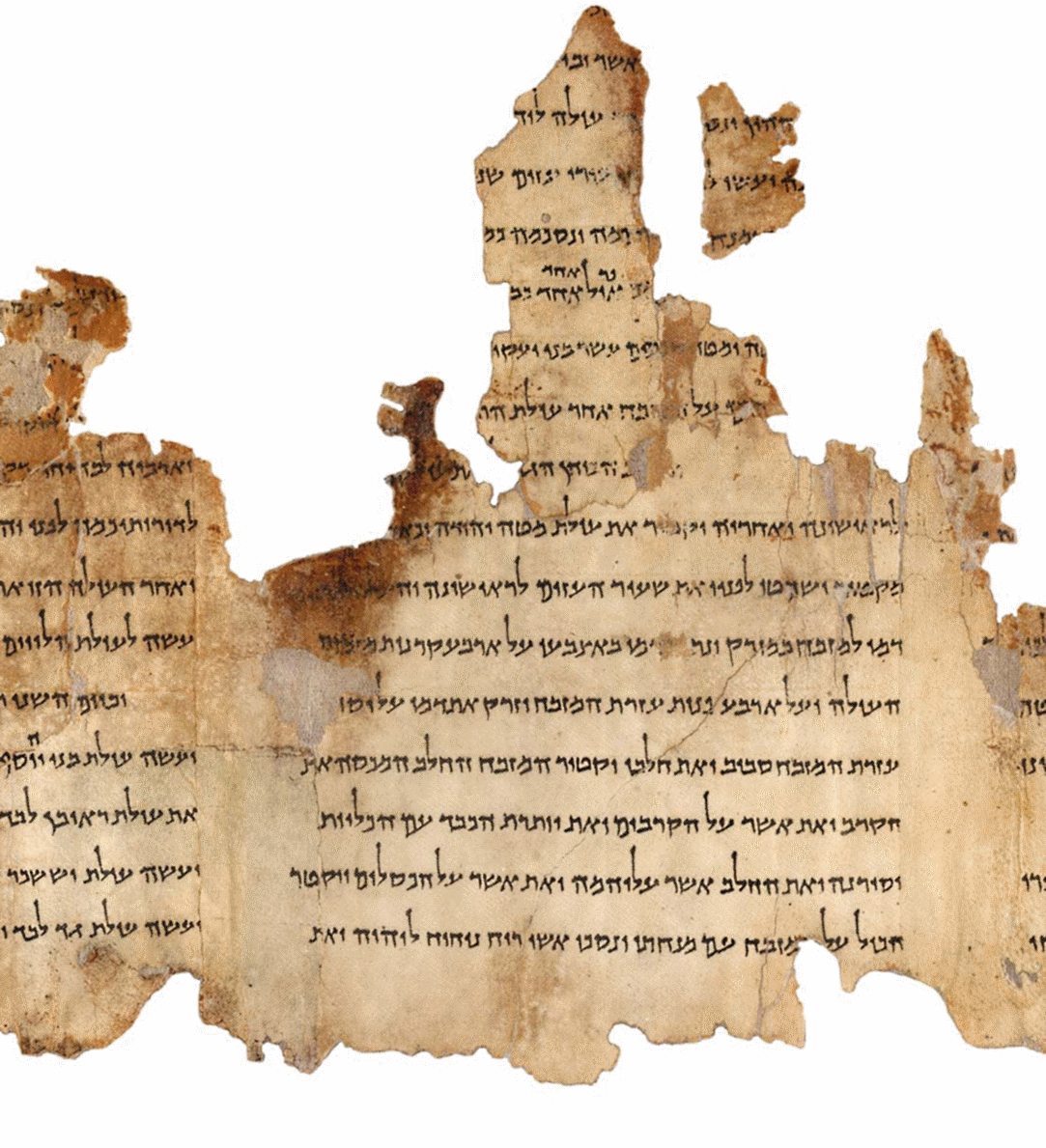
Portion of the Temple Scroll, one of the Dead Sea Scrolls, written in Hebrew during the late Second Temple period

Some of the later books of the Hebrew Bible, including Ezra and Nehemiah, Esther, Daniel, Chronicles, and Haggai, Zechariah, and Malachi, are explicitly dated to the Second Temple period. The first and second verses of the book of Ezekiel were written during the Babylonian exile. There are varying opinions about when Ecclesiastes, the Song of Songs, Jonah, some of the Psalms, and possibly the Book of Job were written. The majority of researchers, however, agree that they were composed during the Second Temple period. Most of these books were written in what linguistics call "Late Biblical Hebrew". This later form of Biblical Hebrew is particularly notables in the Book of Chronicles since it occasionally rewrites sections from Samuel and Kings and modifies parts to conform to post-exilic usage. However, not all of the Second Temple literature exhibits the language traits of late Biblical Hebrew to the same degree; some of it is written in a manner that is strikingly reminiscent of classical Biblical Hebrew.

Hebrew was still a spoken language during the Second Temple period at least in some areas of Judea. It continued to be used up until 200 CE, and possibly even after. It is thought that the Hebrew spoken during the Second Temple period evolved from Biblical Hebrew, possibly from a distinct dialect. This form of Hebrew is now known as Mishnaic Hebrew. The Hasideans, who are believed to be the precursors of both the Essenes and the Pharisees, used a combination of Biblical Hebrew and Mishnaic Hebrew as their literary language, with Mishnaic Hebrew dominating. The literature of the Tannaim and Amoraim of the Land of Israel and Babylonia is written in Mishnaic Hebrew, which is later found in the Mishnah. Among the earliest are the tractates of Tamid and Middot. It reflects a living Hebrew that is not just an artificial language reserved for Jewish scholars, despite the fact that this language has been fixed in rabbinic discussions. The Qumran group continued to use Late Biblical Hebrew, which was still a literary language, while fusing it with their own unique linguistic traits.

The first century Jewish historian Flavius Josephus asserts that he addressed the people of Jerusalem in Hebrew. But as usual, his testimony is ambiguous and at odds with the Aramaic transcriptions he uses to describe Jewish traditions. Spoken Hebrew saw a brief resurgence in interest during the Bar Kokhba revolt (132–135 CE). The Mishna, however, was written down circa 200 CE because it could no longer be memorized and could no longer be transmitted orally due to the lack of Hebrew speakers who could memorize it.

Archaeology provides evidence of the usage of Mishnaic Hebrew in the Second Temple period. It can be found in texts found in the Judaean Desert from the first and second centuries, including the Copper Scroll found in Qumran and the Bar Kokhba letters and other writings found in caves near Nahal Hever. These documents provide a glimpse of everyday Hebrew, without indicating which regions they pertain to. Judean Desert examples tend to indicate that it is a southern dialect.

=== Greek ===
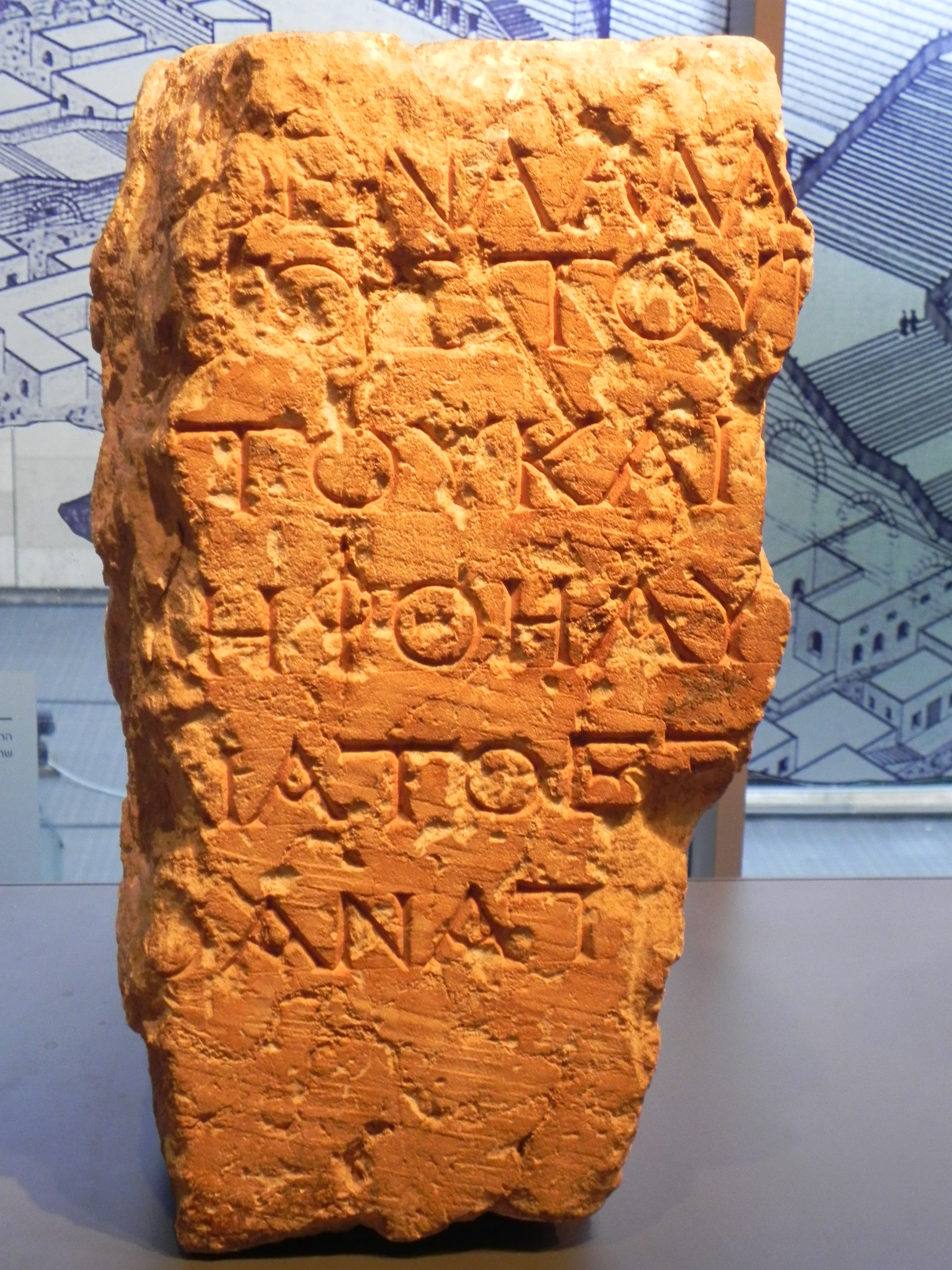
The Temple Warning inscription, one of two tablets found. This Greek inscription served as a warning to pagan visitors to the Second Temple not to go any further.

Greek was the primary language of the Jews of Hellenistic and Roman Egypt, particularly those of Alexandria. Although the Jews of Egypt used Aramaic in the early Ptolemaic period, it was quickly abandoned in favor of Greek. It is only in the early Byzantine period that Egyptian Jewish communities communicated with one another in Hebrew, which again served as the official language.

The use of Greek was not limited to the Jewish Diaspora. From the third century BCE onward, almost all inscriptions in the Southern Levant were written in Greek, with the exception of tombs and ossuaries, as well as those in synagogues. Many ossuaries of the period bear inscriptions in Greek, either indicating the tombs of families descended from the Diaspora or assisting authorities in identifying the tombs. According to the Mishna, Greek was even present in the Temple of Jerusalem.

The Jews of Alexandria celebrated the translation of the Scriptures into Greek with an annual festival on the island of Pharos, known for its famed lighthouse, featuring a grand beach picnic. The festival honored the translation as a divine gift and commemorated the site where, according to tradition, the translation was completed. This celebration reflected the profound importance of the Greek version for Diaspora Jews who could not access the original Hebrew texts.

Greek was widely used in Judaea, at least in a certain social stratum. Greek was also used in legal documents such as the Babatha Archives and the Bar Kokhba letters. The Septuagint, a Greek translation of the Hebrew Bible, was not limited to Jews in the Diaspora - it was also used in Judea, as evidenced by the discovery of fragments at Qumran and Nahal Hever.

Greek names like Jason, Menelaus, and Alexander were popular among Jews throughout most of the Second Temple period. Some Pharisees, too, had Greek names like Antigonus of Sokho or P[t]ollion.

== Identity ==
During the Second Temple period, Jewish identity was ethnic, with ancient sources consistently portraying it as based on descent and membership in the ethnic group. Religious observance was integrated into this ethnic framework and perceived by outsiders as a core characteristic of Jewish ethnic identity. Ancient Greek, Roman, and Jewish authors constantly define the Jewish people as an ethnos, one of the many ethne living in the Greco-Roman world. Van Maaren demonstrates why Jews of the late Second Temple period may be regarded as an ethnic group in modern terms by using the six characteristics that co-ethnics share as outlined by Hutchinson and Smith. Those include:

1. An ethnonym, a common proper name, that identifies and conveys the "essence" of its community. In antiquity, three proper names were used to refer to the Jewish ethnos, namely: "Hebrew", "Israel", and "Jews". In Second Temple period texts, the term "Hebrew" was used to describe an individual from the pre-monarchic period of Jewish history. The term "Israel" was used as a timeless designation of the ethnos or to refer to members who were a part of the united monarchy, the earlier northern kingdom, or eschatological Israel. Members of the contemporary ethnos were usually referred to as "Jews," and the name can also apply to a geographically confined subgroup or to the descendants of the earlier kingdom of Judah.
2. A myth of common ancestry. In the Jewish case, of descent from eponymous ancestor Jacob/Israel; moreover, the purported descent from Abraham was exploited by the Hasmoneans to broaden definitions of Jewishness, although this claim was disputed by others.
3. Shared memories of the past, including historical events and heroes. Jewish sacred scriptures provide a fundamental collection of those historical stories. The community reading of the Hebrew Bible and other texts in synagogues helped to further ingrain the stories and characters they contain in the collective Jewish identity. That includes figures such as the Patriarchs, Moses and David, and events such as the Exodus, the covenant at Mount Sinai, the heyday of the united monarchy, the Babylonian captivity, the Antiochene persecutions, and the Maccabean revolt.
4. One or more elements of shared culture, which need not be specified, but usually include religion, language, and customs. There were significant overlaps between the religion, languages, customs, and other cultural aspects shared by ancient Jews; moreover, religion cannot be separated from other cultural aspects, especially in ancient times. The worship of the God of Israel, the work of the Temple in Jerusalem and other cultic sites, and the following of particular Jewish customs (dietary laws, Sabbath observance, etc.) were major aspects of Jewishness at the period. Despite the fact that not all Jews spoke the same language, because many of the sacred writings were written in Hebrew, it also served as a symbol for Jews who did not speak the language.
5. A connection to a homeland, which need not be physically occupied by the ethnic group in order for it to have symbolic attachment to their ancestral homeland, as is the case for diaspora populations. In the Jewish case, this is the Land of Israel, or Judaea/Palaestina. For both the local Jews and those residing in the diaspora, the land held symbolic value. It endures despite the frequently shifting, occasionally nonexistent borders.
6. A sense of solidary on the part of at least some sections of the ethnic population. The strength of this sentiment varies. Josephus reports that when the First Jewish–Roman War broke out, the Jews of Scythopolis joined the city in fighting the Jewish rebels because they had weaker sense of solidarity for the Jewish ethnos.

Shaye J. D. Cohen defines Jewish identity in the late Second Temple period as being "ethno-religious" in character.

In the centuries following the First Jewish–Roman War and the destruction of the Second Temple, Jewish identity gradually transformed from an ethnos with a distinct religious identity to a religious community that also considered itself a nation.

=== Nationalism ===
Anthony D. Smith, an historical sociologist considered one of the founders of the interdisciplinary field of nationalism studies, wrote that Jews of the late Second Temple period provide "a closer approximation to the ideal type of the nation [...] than perhaps anywhere else in the ancient world." He adds that this observation "must make us wary of pronouncing too readily against the possibility of the nation, and even a form of religious nationalism, before the onset of modernity." Smith argues that despite losing their monarchy and living under foreign powers, the Jews of Jerusalem gradually established an "autonomous ethnoreligious community" anchored in the Temple, drawing on a "golden age" of the Mosaic Covenant. He points to the Maccabean Revolt as a pivotal moment, when Hasmonean leaders such as Simon fused military command with the high priesthood, a position legitimized through "ratification of the assembled people." Smith notes a growing focus on the territorial boundaries of Israel, an "efflorescence of Temple culture," the rise of synagogues as a parallel institution, and broader adherence to Jewish law over the ensuing periods. He argues that despite internal rifts, Roman rule helped deepen these trends, with movements giving voice to "heightened national sentiment" among substantial segments of the Jewish population under Rome. While the Jewish people, in his opinion, have been a nation since as early as the 7th century BCE, nationalism per his definition did not emerge until the Roman period, with the Zealots and during the Bar Kokhba Revolt, whose "religio-political" uprisings aimed to "restore the Hasmonean national state."

Historian David Goodblatt also supports the view that premodern groups can meet the criteria for a nation, with Jews being a prime example. Agreeing with Smith, Goodblatt proposes dropping the qualifier "religious" in the definition of Jewish nationalism during this period, noting that according to Smith, a religious component in national memories and culture is common even in the modern era. This perspective is echoed by political scientist Tom Garvin, who writes that "something strangely like modern nationalism is documented for many peoples in medieval times and in classical times as well," citing ancient Jews as one of several "obvious examples", alongside classical Greeks, Gauls and British Celts.

Historian Salo W. Baron applied the term "ethnic-religious nationalism" to both ancient Jews and ancient Greeks. According to Israel Levine, early Hellenistic Greek observers described Jews as eastern philosophers living in a utopian ethno-national context, apart from the political unrest of the time. Jewish texts from the Persian period show no political aspirations for independence, and in the early Hellenistic period, Jews viewed the Hellenistic rulers favorably. However, the circumstances leading up to the Maccabean revolt in the 170s and 160s BCE fostered a militaristic-zealot tradition that continued to play a key role in national life until the Bar Kokhba revolt in the 130s CE.

=== Jewish identity in the Diaspora ===
The homeland remained the common symbolic tie for Diaspora Jews, seen as the center of the universe, even though most Jews living abroad would not return and many loved both their native Greco-Roman cities and Jerusalem, the city of the temple. It is possible that the Jews of Smyrna, Asia Minor, donated money to support city projects. Trebilco refers to them as "former Judeans" rather than "former Jews," implying that they were being referred to as a group whose origins were in Judea but who were now devoted to their current city of residency and even made contributions to public enterprises. Jews in Acmonia, Phrygia made donations to their city and referred to it as their patris, "home city" or "native town".

Philo of Alexandria, writing in the early 1st century CE, provides valuable insight into the connection of Diaspora Jews with Judea. By Philo's time, Jews had long been present in the Diaspora and particularly in Alexandria for quite a long time. Because his fellow nationals had lived in Alexandria for many generations, Philo appears to have thought of it as his city. But on the same time, Philo wrote that while Diaspora Jews refer to the place where they were born and raised as their fatherland, they consider Jerusalem to be their mother city:

...they hold the Holy City where the sacred Temple of the most high God to be their mother city, yet those which are an inheritance from their fathers, grandfathers, and ancestors even farther back, are in each case, accounted by them to be their fatherland in which they were born are reared.

In an effort to explain the situation of Diaspora Jews in terms that Greek readers would comprehend, Philo portrayed them as immigrants who founded colonies (Greek: apoikiai), with Jerusalem being their mother-city (metropolis). According to Kasher, Alexandria could only be considered a homeland in this case since it was where a Jewish "colony" was founded. The colony was organized as a distinct ethnic union with a recognized political and legal status (politeuma), with Jerusalem serving as its mother-city.

Philo of Alexandria considered the ethnic distinctions between Egyptians and Jews to be more significant than those between Greeks and Jews, viewing native Egyptians as the lowest-class residents who practiced ridiculous habits. Around the same time, Apion, an Alexandrian possibly of Egyptian descent, spoke of the closeness between Jews and Egyptians and the inherent enmity between Jews and Greeks. Apion believed that Jews were descended from Egyptians, a claim Josephus denied. Philo noted that both Jews and Egyptians practiced circumcision and were passionate about their nationalistic and religious beliefs, though the majority of each population did not hold Roman citizenship.

== Demography ==
This section refers to the late Second Temple period, unless specified.

=== By area ===
During the late Second Temple period and up until the Bar Kokhba revolt, Judea proper, Galilee, Peraea, Sharon, and western Samaria constituted a band of nearly continuous Jewish settlement. Central and northern Samaria was inhabited by Samaritans.

==== Judea ====
During the late Second Temple period, the regions of Judea and Benjamin had a dense Jewish population that resided in various types of rural settlements, including towns, villages, agricultural homesteads and fortified estates.

==== Galilee ====
The Galilee was sparsely populated up to the Hasmonean conquest, with the majority of its inhabitants concentrated in fortified centers on the margins of the western and central valleys. During that time, the Upper Galilee was home to a predominantly pagan populace with ties to the Phoenician coast. According to the Book of Maccabees, Jewish communities were already present in Galilee during the Maccabean Revolt and before the area was incorporated into the Hasmonean kingdom.

Much of the Galilee was conquered and annexed by the first Hasmonean king Aristobulus I around 104–103 BCE. This conquest encouraged a significant Jewish influx into Galilee. After the Roman conquest of Judaea in 63 BCE, a second, larger wave of Jewish immigration settled in the region. During the end of the first century BCE and the beginning of the first century CE, large and important towns were founded in Galilee. The Jewish population in Galilee continued to prosper after the Second Temple period and especially as a result of the Bar Kokhba revolt, when it replaced the depopulated Judea as the spiritual, demographic and cultural center of Jews in the Land of Israel. Judaism reached its political and cultural pinnacle in Galilee during the late second and early third century CE.

==== Perea ====
Historical accounts and archaeological discoveries from the late Second Temple period provide evidence of the Jewish settlements in Perea. Based on the database of the Jordanian Antiquities Department, Sagiv's research of Jewish Transjordan revealed 160 settlement sites in Peraea with Late Hellenistic and/or Early Roman potsherds.

The little excavations that have been done there show that Jewish habitation there continued after the First Jewish Revolt, was abandoned or destroyed during the Bar Kokhba Revolt, and then there was a settlement gap throughout the Late Roman period.

==== Idumaea ====
Even before the final collapse of the kingdom of Judah in 586 BCE, the Edomites were driven from their ancestral homeland and former kingdom east of the Arabah and began to settle in the southern parts of Judea, which came to be known in classical sources as "Idumaea". This settlement process was continuous, and it was carried out using both peaceful penetration and military invasion.

Ostraca dating from the 4th century BCE from sites in Idumaea including Arad, Beer-sheba, Tell Jemmeh, Maresha, and others, indicate a very diverse population that inhabited the district during the late Persian period, with about 32% Arab names, 27% Idumean names, 25% general West Semitic names, 10% Judahite names, and 5% Phoenician names.

Around the mid-third century BCE, a Hellenized Phoenician community from Sidon settled in Maresha. During the reign of Hasmonean leader John Hyrcanus in the late second century BCE, the Edomites converted to Judaism and were assimilated into the Jewish people.

==== Samaria ====
The majority of Samaria's people in the first century CE are thought to have been Samaritans. Samaria was also inhabited by Jews (in southern and central Samaria), native Hellenized Semitic people, descendants of Macedonians who settled in the city of Samaria under Alexander the Great, colonists who flocked there under the Roman governor of Syria, Gabinius, and mercenaries "of the neighboring populations" who were brought to Sebaste by Herod the Great.

Samaritans and Jews had a hostile relationship; Josephus describes one instance in which Jews from the Galilee were attacked by Samaritans in Ginae while traveling to a festival in Jerusalem, resulting in the death of one of them.

==== Coastal plain (Paralia) ====
The coastal plain, or Paralia as it was known since the Hellenistic period, did not have a Jewish majority. With the exception of a brief period of Hasmonean rule, Herod's reign, and Agrippa's brief reign, the region was not under Jewish rule for most of the Second Temple period. The coast was home to mostly Hellenistic-pagan settlements during Josephus' day, some of which were particularly significant from an economic, cultural, and political standpoint. Joppa was the only Jewish city on the coast and remained so up until the First Jewish-Roman war (66–73 CE), when there were significant Jewish minorities in Caesarea and Jamnia, and to a lesser degree, in Ascalon and Ptolemais and other settlements along the coast.

=== Total numbers ===
The number of Jews residing in the world and in Judea in ancient times is almost impossible to determine, as it is with other ancient populations, and research in that area has fallen out of scholarly favor in recent years. Nonetheless, a few academics have offered estimates over the years using different approaches.

==== In Judaea ====
Broshi estimated that there were not much more than 1 million people living in Palestine during Roman and Byzantine times, by multiplying the estimated population of the 26 towns that were known during the Roman-Byzantine period (based on projected population density) by three, using the assumption that the urban population made up around a third of the total population.

According to Seth Schwartz, the most responsible estimates put the pre-modern sustainable population of Palestine at about one million, a figure that was attained in the middle of the first century, with about half of them being Jews.

According to Ze'ev Safrai, "at this point we do not have exact information regarding the population of Provincia Judaea during the Roman period". He asserts that there were more people living in Palestine than the one million people suggested by Broshi.

Although McGinn cautions that it is nearly impossible to estimate Judaea's carrying capacity, he estimates that Palestine's agricultural population at the same time period may have reached up to one million people, not all of whom were Jews. Also, he suggested a maximum population range for Jerusalem and Caesarea, of 70,000 to 100,000 and 38,000 to 47,500 respectively.

==== Worldwide ====
In the 13th century, Christian writer Bar Hebraeus claimed that 6,944,000 Jews were counted in the Claudius census, which was conducted in the middle of the 1st century CE. Salo Wittmayer Baron asserted that there were 8 million Jews in the first century, based on Bar Hebraeus' estimate of 7 million Jews living inside the Roman Empire and adding an estimated million people living outside the empire. However, these figures are much disputed by contemporary scholars.

== Material culture ==
As archeological evidence reveals, Jewish communities in Judea, Galilee, and Gaulanitis were quite divided by cultural attitudes but were interconnected by religious customs and, likely, beliefs. Workshops for kitchen pottery, standardized oil jars, and household or community ritual baths (mikvaot) show that Jews began to incorporate explicitly religious practices and attitudes into their homes and everyday lives as early as the first century BCE. They started using stone vessels and a particular new type of oil lamps in the latter first century BCE and early first century CE to further distinguish and identify themselves. However, in the affluent neighborhoods of Jerusalem, the wealthy adopted the use of decorated tableware, Italian cooking utensils, foreign eating customs, and the construction of lavish display tombs, all of which reflect foreign, classicizing practices and attitudes. These findings are rare in Judea, the Jewish Galilee, and Gaulantis.

Archaeologist Yonatan Adler has argued that the widespread appearance of purpose-built ritual baths and chalk vessels associated with concerns about ritual purity dates mainly to the first century BCE and first century CE. Hundreds of such immersion pools have been identified across ancient Judea, while chalk vessels became common in Judean households during the same period.

== Burial ==
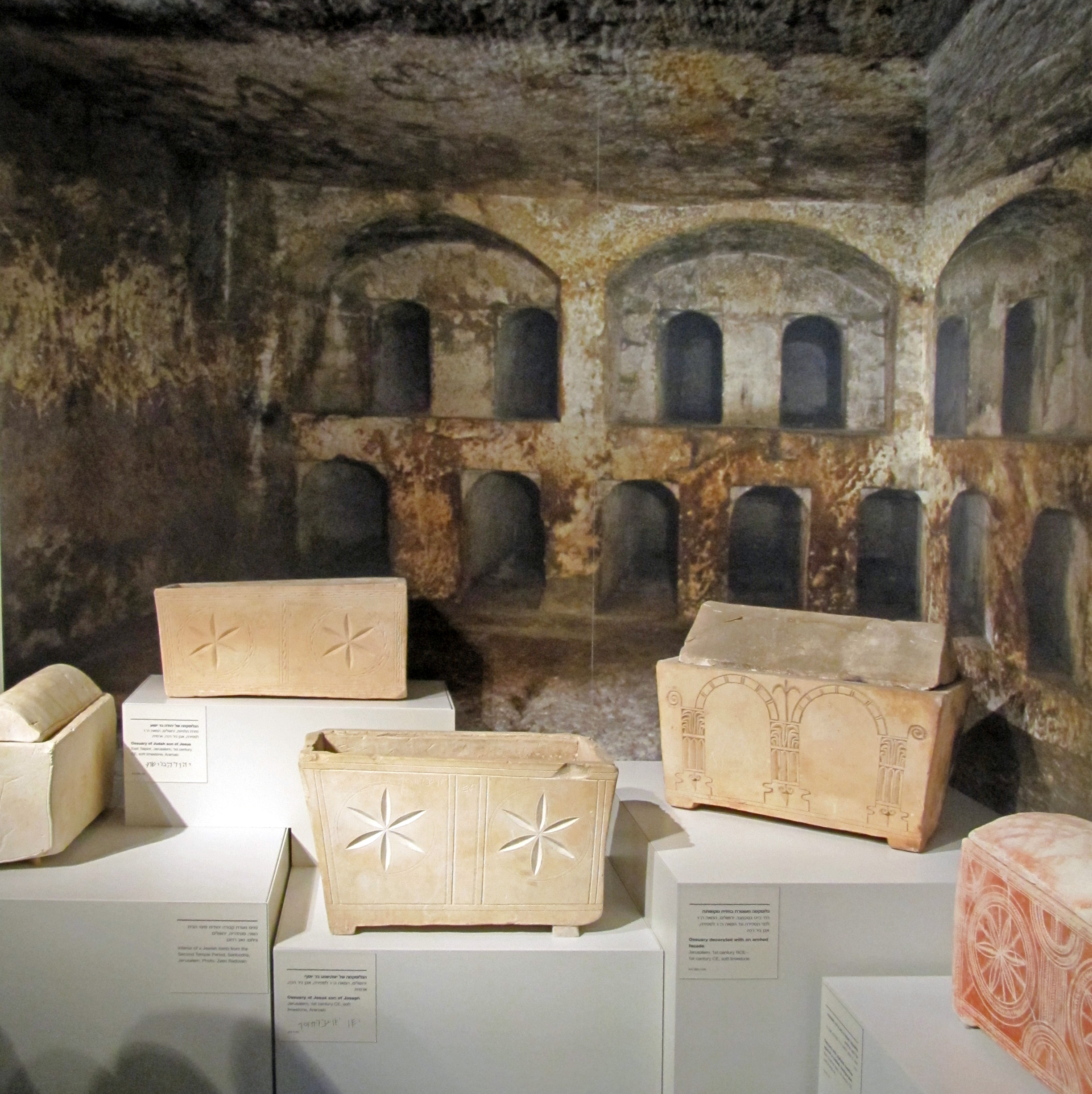
Second Temple period ossuaries discovered in Jerusalem, Israel Museum.

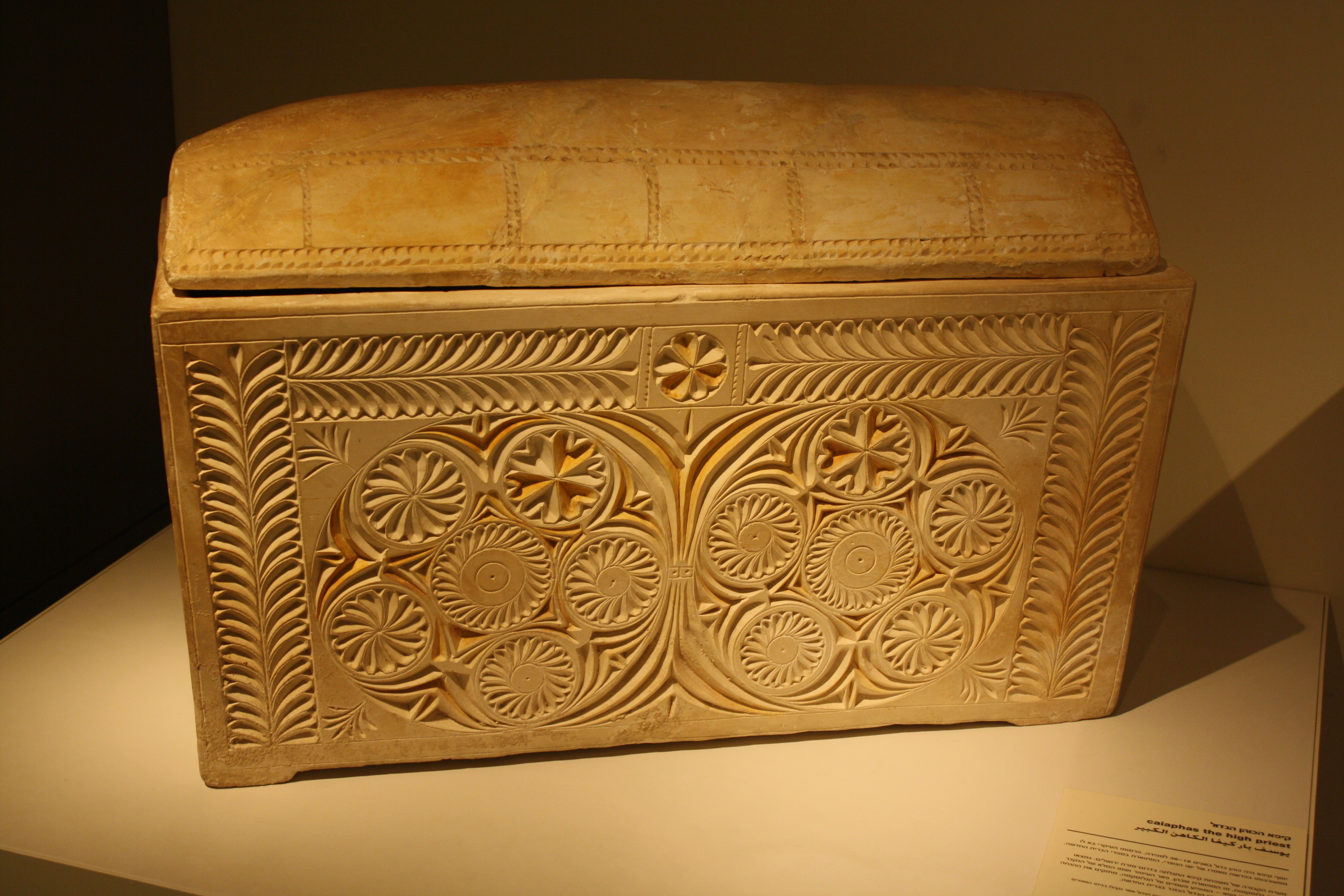
The Caiaphas ossuary, discovered in south Jerusalem. It mentions Joseph ben Caiaphas of New Testament fame, high priest from 18 to 36 CE

In contrast to earlier and later Jewish burial practices, the two acceptable types of burial during the late Second Temple period (1st–2nd centuries BCE and CE) were primary burial in coffins and secondary burial in ossuaries. For primary burial, coffins were placed in kokhim. After a while, bones were collected for secondary burial in kokhim and placed in ossuaries. Ossuaries, which were cut from local limestone, were either kept on the floor or on shelves in specially carved niches in the walls of the tomb. It was common for the ossuaries to be decorated with ornaments that included typical motifs of the period. In Jerusalem, for example, palm branches and flowers, especially the rosette, were typical motives. Funerary inscriptions with names etched or inscribed in Hebrew or Greek ossuaries are commonly found on ossuaries and sometimes on tombs.

=== Monumental burial ===
The earliest known Jewish burial monument was built by Simon Thassi, a Hasmonean leader who ruled Judea from 143 to 134 BCE. Simon constructed an now-lost elaborate tomb complex for his family in Modi'in. This tomb, described in 1 Maccabees and by Josephus, featured seven pyramids for his family members, surrounded by great columns adorned with suits of armor and carved ships, intended to be visible to all who sailed the sea.

==== In Jerusalem ====
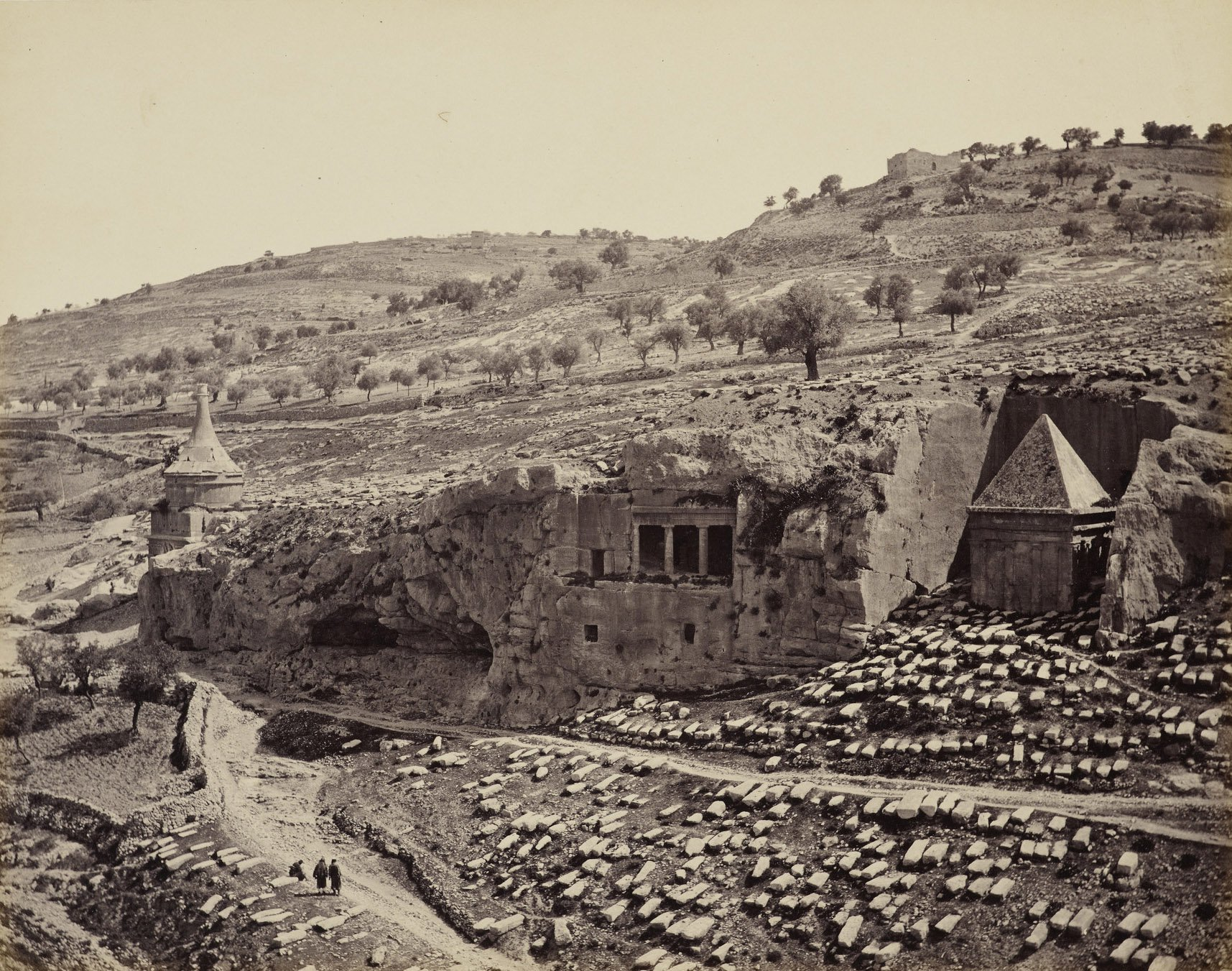
The monumental tombs of the Kidron Valley, photographed in 1862 by Francis Bedford

A number of monumental tombs were built around Jerusalem during the early Roman period. Examples are the so-called "Tombs of the Sanhedrin", Umm al-Amad, and the monumental tombs of the Kidron Valley, including the Tomb of Absalom, Tomb of Zechariah, and the Tomb of Benei Hezir. As a common practice in the Greco-Roman world, these tombs were built along ancient roads that have since disappeared. Scholars believe these tombs were built by individuals seeking to elevate themselves and their families in the eyes of Jews in both the Land of Israel and the Diaspora by employing temple-like architectural designs. One of the most well known sites of the period, also built near Jerusalem, is the rock-cut funerary complex known as the "Tombs of the Kings", which may be associated with Helena of Adiabene.

According to Jewish Law (Mishnah, Bava Batra tractate), due to the sanctity of Jerusalem and the impurity of the dead, burial was only allowed beyond the city's walls and fifty cubits away. When the city expanded, the cemeteries were removed (except for the graves of the House of David and Huldah). It has been suggested that the Uzziah tablet, which says "Hither were brought the bones of Uzziah, king of Judah. Not to be opened", might indicate that king Uzziah's tomb was relocated beyond the city's walls during this period. Jericho's cemetery was also located outside the town's limits.

==== In rural Judea ====
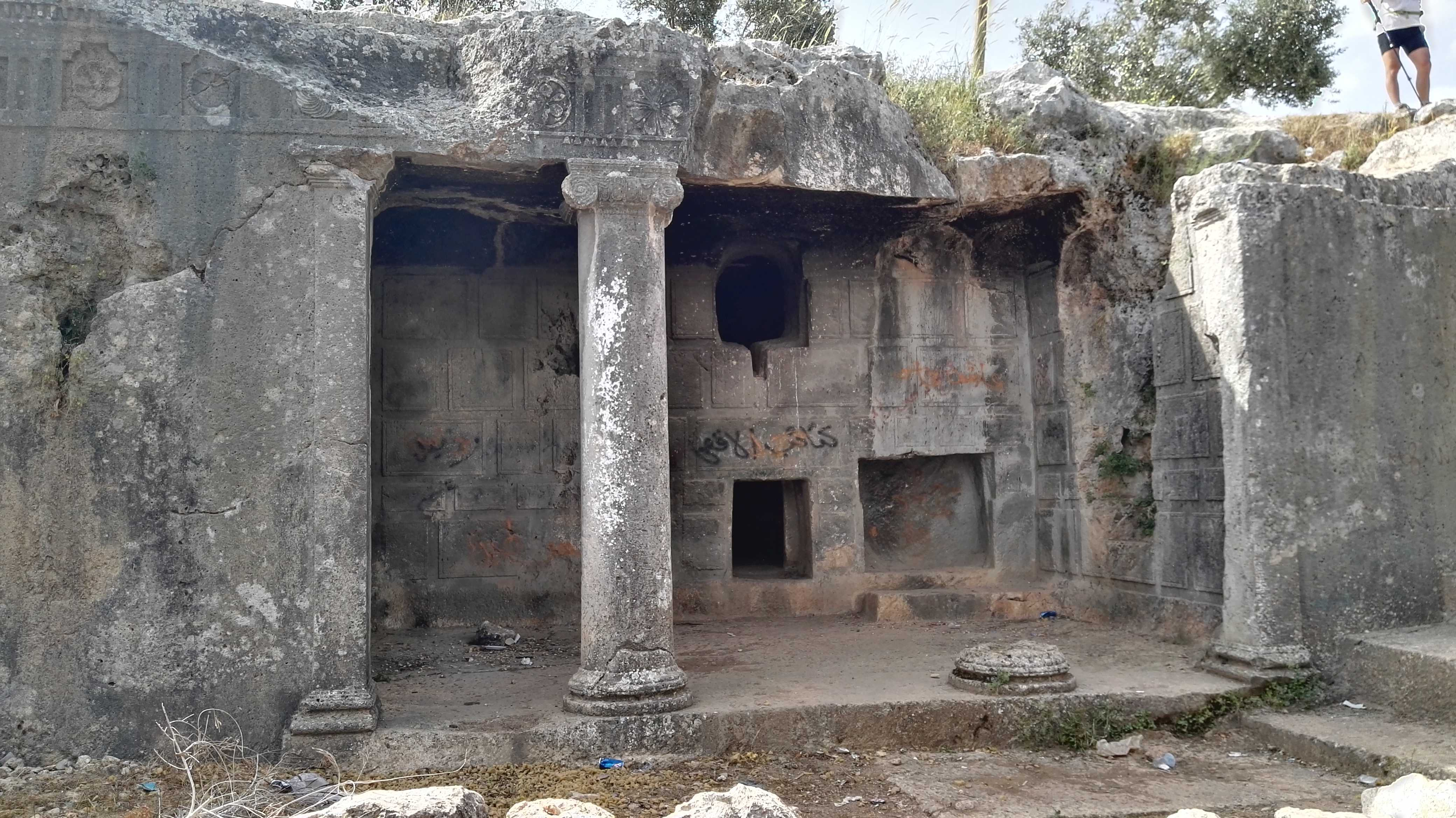
The funerary complex of Deir ed-Darb, Western Samaria, modern-day Qarawat Bani Hassan

Elaborate rock-cut tombs with designs resembling those found in Jerusalem were found in multiple sites in western Samaria, including Khirbet Kurkush, Deir ed-Darb and Mokata 'Aboud, and in the Western Hebron Hills, including Khirbat al-Simia, Rujm el-Fihjeh and Khirbet el Jof. The great similarity between these tombs and the Jerusalem tombs and the lack of a local Hellenistic prototype have led the researchers to the assumption that the decorated tombs in western Samaria and the western Hebron Hills are not the result of an internal development of the burial system there but rather the result of a deliberate copying of the Jerusalem tombs, at the special request of local, affluent families.

While most scholars agree that the tombs of the elaborate tombs of western Samaria and the western Hebron Hills date to the same period as their Jerusalem counterparts, Yuval Magen offers a contrasting view, proposing that differences in design quality and craftsmanship indicate a chronological gap between them. Magen suggests dating the tombs of Western Samaria and the Western Hebron Hills to a later period—possibly the end of the first century or the beginning of the second century CE. Magen also posits a connection between the construction of these tombs and the influx of Jewish artisans who fled Jerusalem during or shortly before its siege in 70 CE, when job opportunities in the city diminished, leaving many quarrymen unemployed.

Peleg-Barkat suggests distinguishing between the rock-cut tombs of western Samaria and those of the western Hebron Hills. According to her analysis, the tombs in western Samaria closely emulate the style seen in Jerusalem, mimicking its architectural features. Conversely, the tombs in the Hebron Hills show less direct imitation of the facade decorations of the Jerusalem tombs, but are influenced by them to a certain degree, and display Judean and Nabatean influences at the same time. She suggests dating these tombs to a period preceding the destruction of the Temple in 70 CE, although she acknowledges the possibility that the Jerusalem style of decoration persisted beyond this time. This phenomenon indicates that the ornate tombs of the Jewish elite in Jerusalem influenced the burial practices of local elites across towns and rural areas in Judaea.

== See also ==
- Archaeology of Israel
- History of ancient Israel and Judah
- History of the Jews and Judaism in the Land of Israel
- History of the Jews in the Roman Empire
- Intertestamental period
- Jerusalem during the Second Temple Period
- Second Temple Judaism
- Timeline of Jewish history

== Bibliography ==
- Green, P (2008). Alexander The Great and the Hellenistic Age. Weidenfeld & Nicolson. p. xiii. ISBN 978-0-7538-2413-9.
- Frei, Peter (2001). "Persian Imperial Authorization: A Summary". In Watts, James (ed.). Persia and Torah: The Theory of Imperial Authorization of the Pentateuch. Atlanta, GA: SBL Press. p. 6. ISBN 9781589830158.
- Romer, Thomas (2008). "Moses Outside the Torah and the Construction of a Diaspora Identity" (PDF). Journal of Hebrew Scriptures. 8, article 15: 2–12. Archived from the original (PDF) on 2020-10-21.
- Vermes, Geza (1981). Jesus the Jew: A Historian's Reading of the Gospels. Philadelphia: First Fortress. ISBN 978-0-8006-1443-0. Archived from the original on 8 October 2020.
