= Marullus =

Marullus may refer to:

- Michael Tarchaniota Marullus, a Renaissance humanist.
- a character based on Gaius Epidius Marullus in the tragedy Julius Caesar by William Shakespeare
- Marullus, the Roman Prefect of Judea under Caligula
