= Marcellus (prefect of Judea) =

Prefect of Judea from 36 to 37

Marcelus Prefect
- Marcellus

6th Prefect of Judaea
- In office c. 37 AD – 38 AD
- Appointed by: Lucius Vitellius
- Preceded by: Pontius Pilate
- Succeeded by: Marullus

Personal details
- Spouse: Unknown

Marcellus was the 6th Roman Prefect of the province of Judea.

== Biography ==
He was a friend of Lucius Vitellius, who appointed him after sending Pontius Pilate to Rome (in 36 or 37) to render account. It may be assumed, however, that Marcellus was not really a governor of Judea, but only a subordinate official, appointed by Vitellius to make sure that taxes continued to be collected for the Empire. This task was usually the job of the local Roman procurator. That Marcellus had less power than an actual prefect is supported by the title given him by Judeo-Roman historian, Josephus, who, in designating Marcellus' office, uses the Greek expression, epimeletes (ἐπιμελητής), "overseer", which is uncommon. Historians are not certain whether Marcellus really had the powers of a prefect or was merely a tax-collecting caretaker. No official act of Marcellus is reported. In 37, he was replaced by Marullus.

However, some insight into the changed situation in Jerusalem after the departure of Pilate is seen in the contrast between the trial and execution of Jesus and that of the first Christian martyr Saint Stephen (Acts 7). In the former, the Sanhedrin (Jewish Council) passed the death sentence but dared not carry it out without the prefect's endorsement, and the execution was carried out by the Roman state (Luke 23.24). In the case of Stephen, the Romans were ignored and the hurried execution was by the old Jewish method of stoning. It would appear that a temporary overseer may have preferred to stay in Caesarea and turn a blind eye to the growing confidence and aggression of the Jewish leaders.

Marcellus (prefect of Judea) Roman Rulers of Judea
Preceded by Pontius Pilate	Prefect of Judaea	Succeeded by Marullus
