= Marullus (prefect of Judea) =

Roman Prefect of Judea (AD 38–41)

Marullus was the 7th Roman Prefect of the Roman province of Judaea 38–41 under Caligula, 37–41.

== Biography ==
He was appointed by the emperor following the recall of Pontius Pilate and the temporary oversight of Marcellus. The period of his prefecture was a stirring and dangerous time due to Caligula's determination to turn the Second Temple into an imperial shrine with an enormous statue of himself in the guise of Jupiter, and the Jews' equal determination to accept no such thing. Nothing is recorded of Marullus's part in the dispute, because the important decisions and negotiations were necessarily taken over by the Syrian Governor (Legate) Publius Petronius.

With the statue being constructed in Sidon and two legions of Roman troops waiting on the border of Galilee to enforce the imperial order, war was eventually avoided by the intervention of Herod Agrippa who dissuaded Caligula from such provocation. Soon afterwards Caligula was assassinated and Herod Agrippa was appointed to take Marullus' place, but with the appellation of "king" as Agrippa I.

== See also ==
- Prefects, Procurators and Legates of Roman Judaea

Marullus (prefect of Judea) Roman Rulers of Judea
Preceded by Marcellus	Prefect of Judaea	Succeeded by King Agrippa I
