= Mourinho (name) =

Mourinho is a Portuguese surname, is a diminutive form of Mouro. Notable people with the surname include:

- José Mourinho (born 1963), Portuguese football manager and former player
- Félix Mourinho (1938–2017), Portuguese professional footballer and coach, father of José Mourinho

== See also ==
- Moura
- Mourão
- Mouriño, Galician equivalent
- Morino, Italian and Japanese equivalent
