= Monolith of Silwan =

Rock-cut tomb located in Silwan, Jerusalem

- קבר בת פרעה (Hebrew)
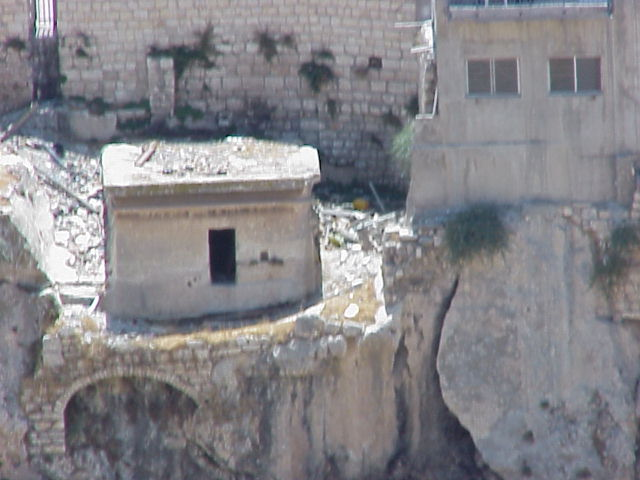
- Current photography taken from a nearby hill of the Monolith of Silwan dated to the 9th–7th century BCE.
- Interactive map of Monolith of Silwan
- 31.77415°N 35.23811°E
- Type: Rock-cut tomb
- Periods: Iron Age II
- Cultures: Kingdom of Judah
- Location: Silwan, Jerusalem
- Part of: Silwan necropolis

History
- Built: 9th–7th century BCE

Site notes
- Material: Rock
- Condition: Unkempt, partially damaged
- Public access: No

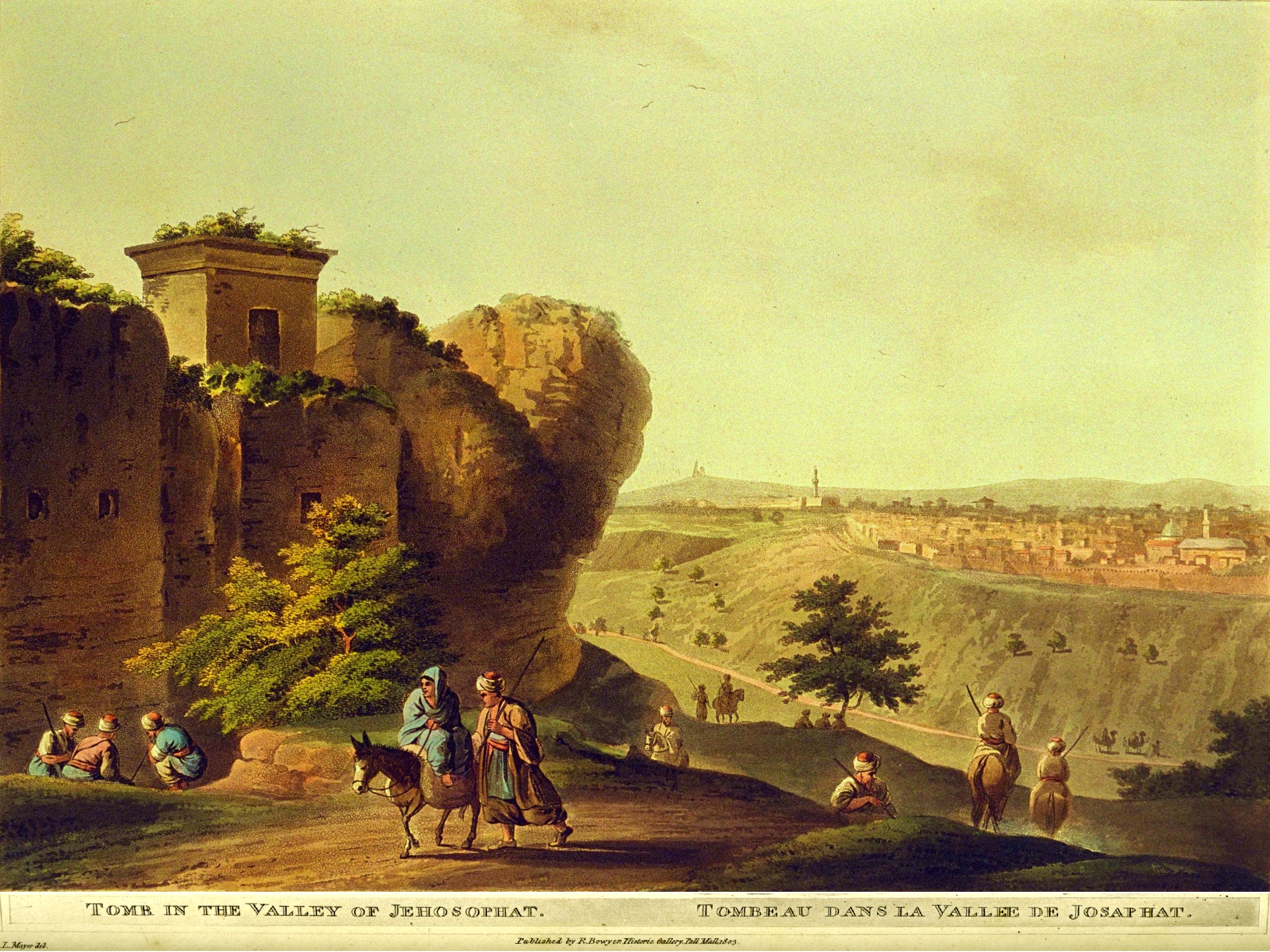
Tomb in the Valley of Jehoshaphat from the original drawings of Luigi Mayer, Views in Palestine, 1804.

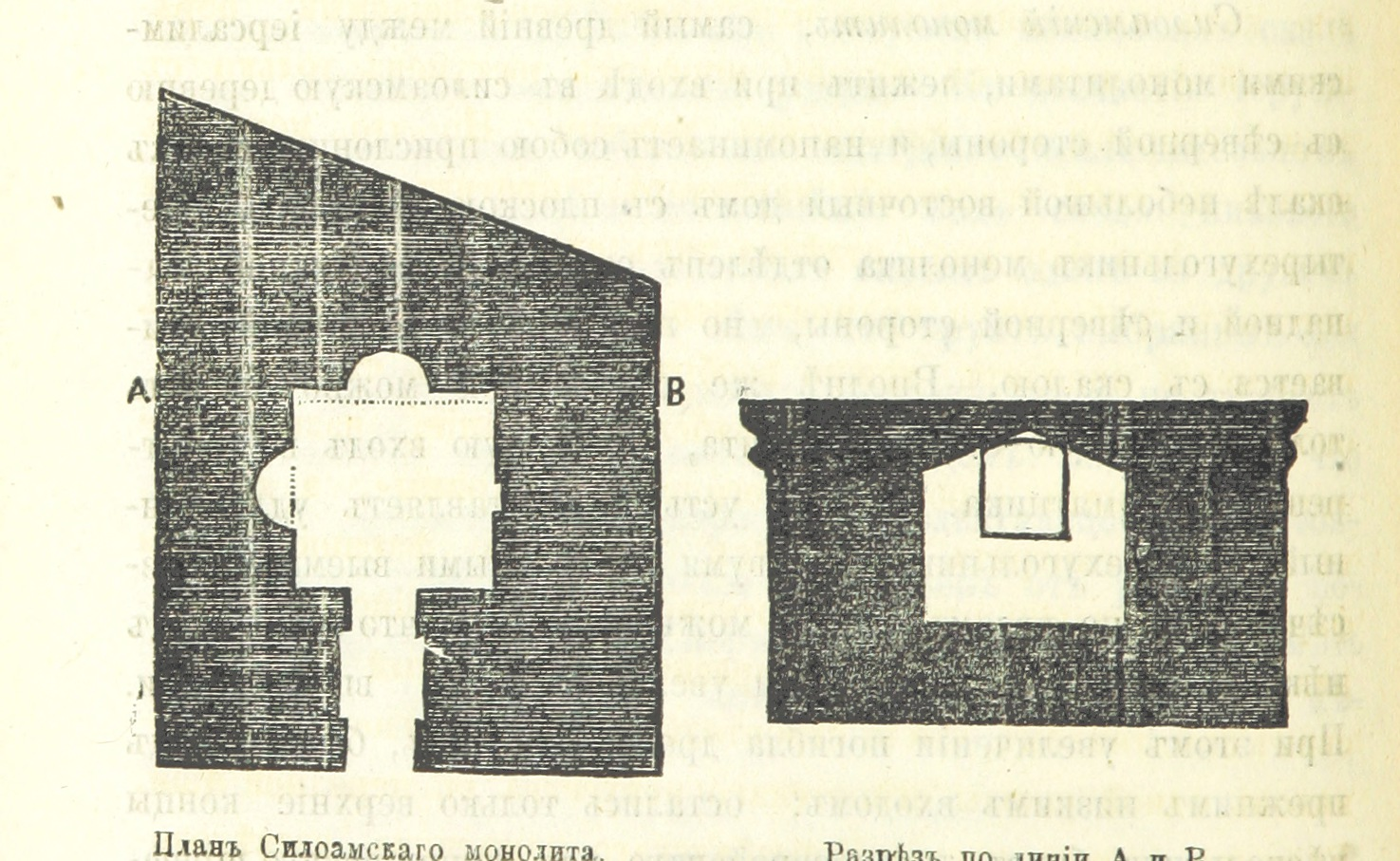
Sketch of the interior of the tomb. An opening cut in the facade of the tomb leads into the burial chamber. By archeologist Akim Aleksyeevich Olesnitskii: A Description of the Holy Land, (1873-1874).

The Monolith of Silwan, also known as the Tomb of Pharaoh's Daughter, is a cuboid rock-cut tomb located in the Kidron Valley, in Silwan, Jerusalem dating from the period of the Kingdom of Judah. The Tomb of Pharaoh's Daughter refers to a 19th-century hypothesis that the tomb was built by Solomon for his wife, the Pharaoh's daughter. The structure, a typical Israelite rock-cut tomb, was previously capped by a pyramid structure like the Tomb of Zechariah. The upper edges of the monolith are fashioned in the shape of an Egyptian cornice. The pyramidal rock cap was cut into pieces and removed for quarry during the Roman era, leaving a flat roof. The tomb contains a single stone bench, indicating that it was designed for only one burial. Recent research indicates that the bench was the base of a sarcophagus hewn into the original building.

The Monolith of Silwan is one of Jerusalem’s most neglected sites, despite being one of the most complete, distinctive and magnificent First Temple-period structure in the city.

The Pharaoh's daughter tradition was first suggested by Louis Félicien de Saulcy, who noted that the Bible claims that Solomon built a temple for his Egyptian wife; de Saulcy, excavating the site in the 19th century, suggested that this might be the same building. However, subsequent archaeological investigation has dated the site to the 9th–7th century BCE, making the connection to Solomon impossible.

Two letters of a single-line Phoenician or Hebrew inscription survive on the building, the remainder of the inscription having been mutilated beyond recognition, by a hermit in the Byzantine era; Byzantine monks increased the height of the low entrance by removing rock which contained the inscription in order to ease access to the tomb, in which they resided. The tomb was cleaned following the 1967 Six-Day War. Neglected since Ussishkin's survey, trash disposal has resulted in an unkempt, unattractive appearance (as of 2013).

== See also ==
- Architecture of ancient Israel
- Rock-cut tombs in ancient Israel
- Tombs of the Sanhedrin
- Tombs of the Kings (Jerusalem)
- Tomb of Benei Hezir
- Tomb of Zechariah (actually not a tomb)
- The Garden Tomb
- Tomb of Absalom
- Cave of Nicanor
- Silwan necropolis
- Royal Steward inscription
- Monolithic architecture
