= Silwan necropolis =

Ancient Jewish cemetery in Jerusalem

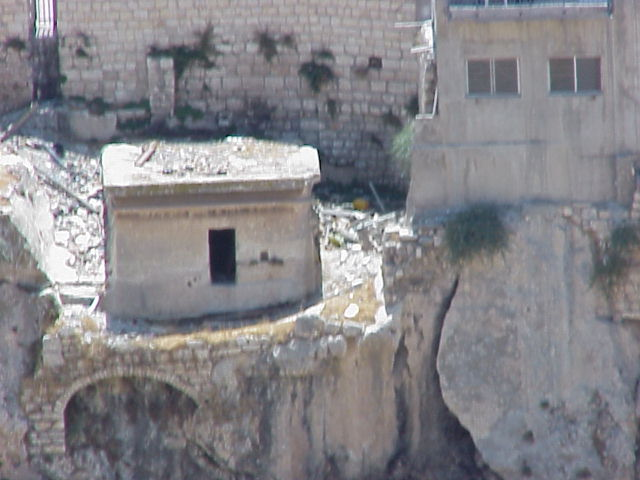
- Remnants of the Monolith of Silwan dated to the 9th–7th century BCE
- Interactive map of Silwan necropolis
- 31.7733°N 35.2368°E
- Type: Necropolis
- Location: Silwan, East Jerusalem

History
- Built: 9th–7th centuries BC

Site notes
- Material: Rock-cut
- Public access: Yes

The Silwan necropolis is the remains of a rock-cut cemetery assumed to have been used by the highest-ranking officials residing in Jerusalem. Its tombs were cut between the 9th and 7th centuries BC. It is situated on the rocky eastern slope of the Kidron Valley, facing the oldest part of Jerusalem. Part of the predominantly Palestinian district of Silwan was later built atop the necropolis.

== History ==
The existence of underlying tombs in the village of Silwan had been known since the 19th century. Charles Warren attempted to carry out a survey of the tombs in 1876—an effort Warren claimed was thwarted by "the hostile nature of the villagers" whom he described as "a lawless set."

According to archaeologist David Ussishkin, the tombs have long since been emptied and their contents removed. They have been subject to structural destruction by quarrying and their conversion into housing. Monks in the Byzantine period used them as dwellings and churches. In modern times, Arab villagers built homes over them or turned them into water cisterns and sewage dumps. No careful survey was performed until 1968.

== Significance ==
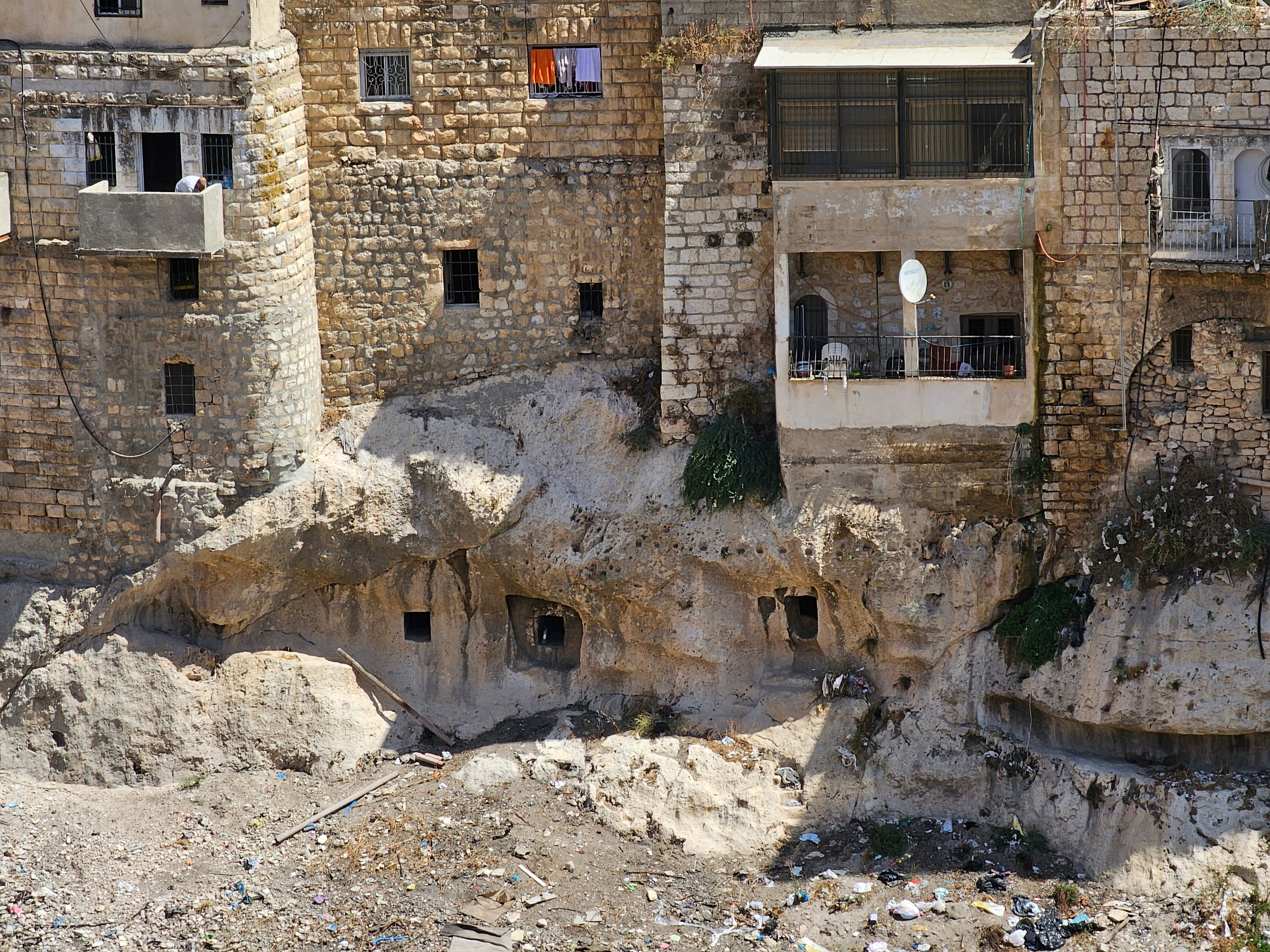
Rock-cut tombs in the bedrock under modern homes in Silwan

The Silwan necropolis is an archaeological site of major significance. In the 19th century, it contained some forty rock-cut tombs of distinguished caliber, of which most were still preserved by the late 1960s. The inscriptions found on three of the tombs are in Hebrew.

The architecture of the tombs and the manner of burial is different "from anything known from contemporary Israel. Elements such as entrances located high above the surface, gabled ceilings, straight ceilings with a cornice, trough-shaped resting-places with pillows, above-ground tombs, and inscriptions engraved on the facade appear only here." The stone benches on which bodies were laid out and the small square entrance doors are similar to those found elsewhere in Judah. David Ussishkin believes that the architectural similarity to building styles of the Phoenician cities validates the Biblical description of Phoenician influence on the Israelite kingdoms.

If the ancient Israelite kingdoms followed the practice of other west-Semitic kingdoms, the kings themselves would have been buried within the city walls, underneath the royal palace. The scholarly consensus is that the royal palace stood on the opposite hill to the west.

== Types of tombs at Silwan necropolis ==
There are three different types of tombs in the Silwan necropolis, each type concentrated in one specific area.

Seven of the tombs feature gabled ceilings and extremely fine stonework. Ussishkin described them as "among the most beautifully rock-cut tombs known in the Jerusalem area even when compared with tombs of later periods." In contrast with the extensive family tombs of later periods, these are for single or double burials, with only one of the seven having room for three bodies. Later destruction has effaced the original doorways.

A second tomb type described by Ussishkin has flat ceilings and 1, 2 or 3 chambers of well-dressed stone carefully squared into spacious rooms. One features a rear chamber of especially "impressive" scale and quality.

There are tombs combining characteristics of the two described here above.

The third type consists of just three "magnificent" monolith tombs, now located in the northern part of the Israeli settlement. These have been carved out of the cliff to create free-standing buildings above the underground burial chambers. Hebrew inscriptions survive on these three tombs; these are the only ancient inscriptions that survive in Silwan.

The following are the three monolith tombs:

=== Tomb of Pharaoh's Daughter ===
The most famous of the ancient rock-cut tombs in Silwan is the finely carved monolith known as the Tomb of Pharaoh's Daughter. It is the only one of the three free-standing tombs in which the above-ground chamber survives, although the pyramid-shaped roof is missing because it was quarried for stone. The ceiling is gabled.

=== Tomb of the Royal Steward ===
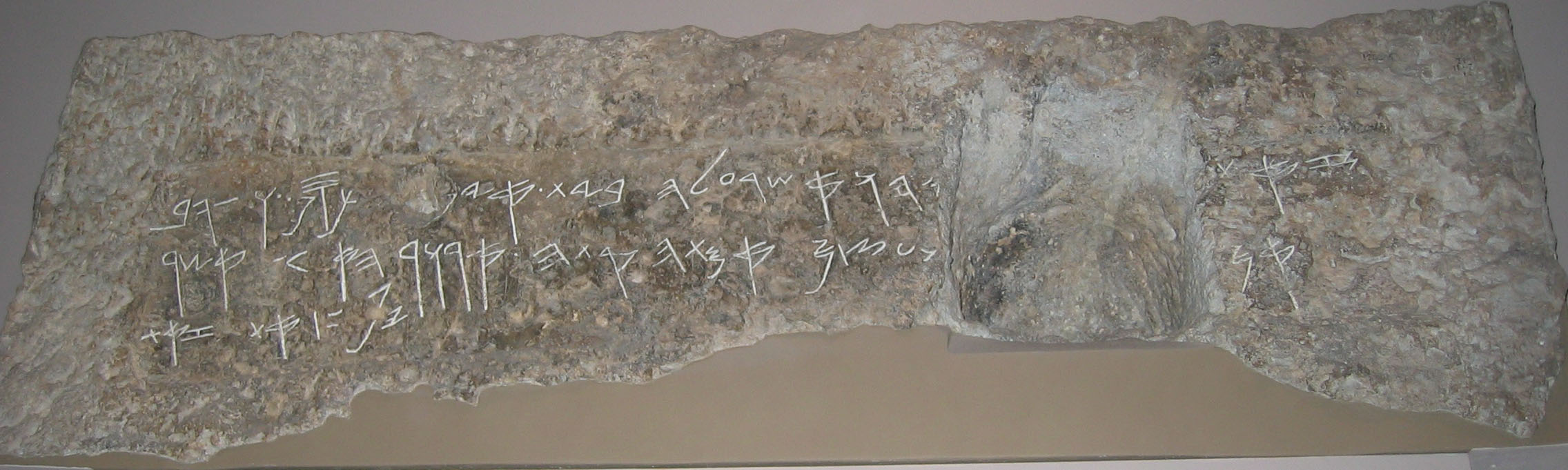
Lintel of the tomb of "...yahu who is over the house"

Another notable tomb, called the Tomb of the Royal Steward, is now incorporated into a modern-period house in the main street of the Israeli settlement. At one point plastered for use as a cistern, in 1968 it was in use as a storage room. It was discovered in 1874 by Charles Simon Clermont-Ganneau.

The ancient inscription reads "This is the tomb of [...]yahu who is over the house. No silver or gold is here but (his bones) and the bones of his Amma. Cursed be the man who opens this." The first part of the Hebrew name is effaced, but it refers to a Judean royal steward or chamberlain. Clermont-Ganneau shipped the tomb inscription to the British Museum, but it was only deciphered in the 1950s by Nahman Avigad. Some scholars believe that this is the tomb of the biblical Shebna, the steward and treasurer of King Hezekiah (727–698 BC). It is thought that at the relevant time the same name could be written with or without the ending -yahu, thus allowing Shebanyahu as a variation of Shebna. According to David Ussishkin, the tomb contained two chambers, the outer chamber with a probable double bench for the occupant and his wife, and an inner chamber with a single burial bench for a relative who may be referred to in the second inscription fragment. The Book of Isaiah (22:16) reproaches Shebna for his presumption: "What hast thou here and whom hast thou here, that thou hast hewn thee out a sepulchre here, as he that heweth him out a sepulchre on high, and that graveth an inhabitation for himself in the rock?"

=== Burial of Z ===
Another former monolith was first described in 1968 by Ussishkin. At that time it was located under the courtyard of a modern-period house serving as a cistern. It has "the finest and most delicate stone dressing in the Silwan necropolis." The upper story was destroyed for use as quarried stone in the Roman/Byzantine period. Only a small section of the inscription survived to be recorded by Ussishkin. The first line is "[This is the] burial of Z ...". The second line "(the one) who op[ens] (this tomb) . .." The third line was illegible.

== See also ==
- Rock-cut tombs in ancient Israel
