= Rock-cut tombs in ancient Israel =

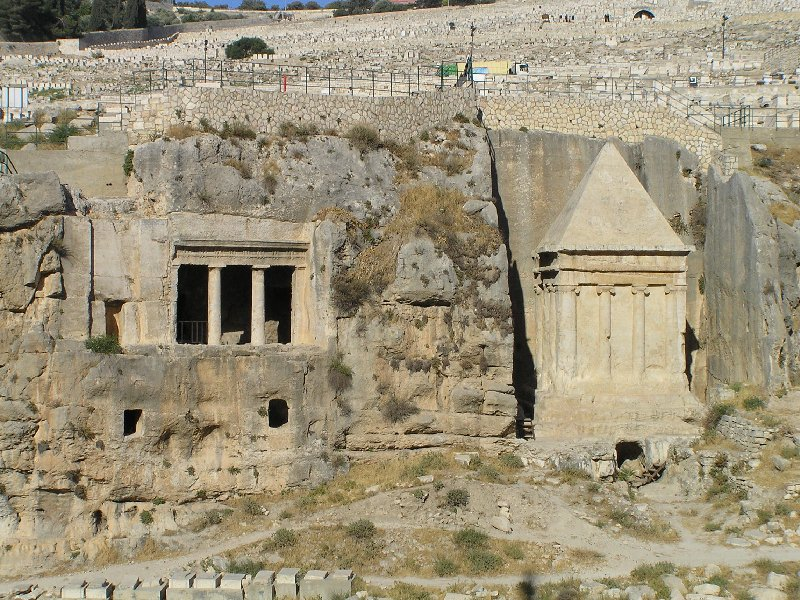
The Tomb of Benei Hezir and the so-called Tomb of Zechariah, Kidron Valley, Jerusalem

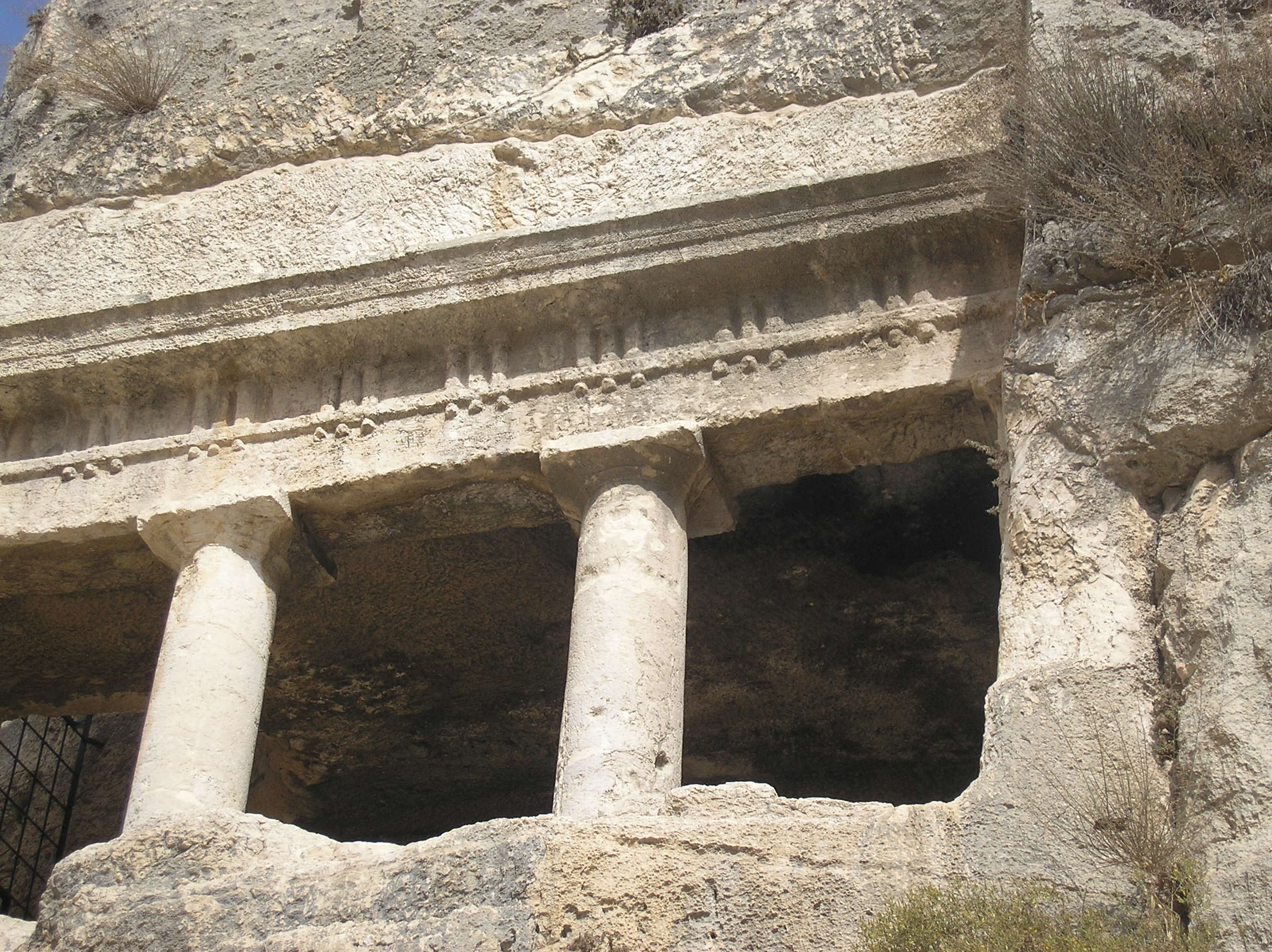
Detail of the Tomb of Benei Hezir

The use of rock-cut cave tombs in the region of ancient Israel began in the early Canaanite period, from 3100–2900 BCE. The custom lapsed a millennium, however, before re-emerging in the earliest Israelite tombs, dating to the 9th century BCE in Jerusalem. The use of rock-cut tombs reached its peak in the 8th and 7th centuries BCE, before rapidly declining and eventually falling out of use in the 6th century BCE in some regions. It reappeared during the Second Temple period and continued into the Late Roman and Byzantine periods.

Use of the tombs has been recorded as recently as the late Roman period around the 3rd century CE.

Rock-cut tombs were a form of burial and interment chamber used in ancient Israel. Cut into the landscapes surrounding ancient Judean cities, their design ranges from single chambered, with simple square or rectangular layouts, to multi-chambered with more complex designs. Almost all burial chambers contain a platform for primary burial and an ossuary or other receptacle for secondary burial. There is debate on if these tombs were originally intended for secondary burials, or if that practice arose later.

The use of such tombs was generally reserved for the middle- and upper-classes, and each typically belonged to a single nuclear or extended family.

== In the Hebrew Bible ==
=== Genesis ===
A number of rock-cut tombs are mentioned in the Bible. Possibly the first, called "Cave of Machpelah", was purchased by Abraham for Sarah from Ephron the Hittite (Gen. 23:20). Traditionally, this tomb, which may have been either a rock-cut or a natural cave, is identified with the Cave of the Patriarchs in modern Hebron. According to very old traditions, Abraham, Isaac and Rebekah, Jacob and Leah were also buried there (Gen. 25:9; 49:29–33; 50:12). The New Testament reaffirms this tradition: "Their (Jacob and his family) bodies were brought back to Shechem and placed in the tomb that Abraham had bought from the sons of Hamor at Shechem for a certain sum of money" (Acts 7:16).

=== Judges through Kings ===
Rock-cut tombs are also mentioned in the Book of Judges (Judges 8:32), the Second Book of Samuel (2 Samuel 2:32), and the Second Books of Kings (2 Kings 9:28, 21:26, 23:16, 23:30).

== Bronze Age precursors: Early Canaanite tombs ==
Early Canaanite I (3100–2900 BCE) period tombs are the earliest rock-cut tombs yet discovered in Israel; several have been found beneath the Ophel in Jerusalem. The custom had lapsed by the second millennium.

== Iron Age: First Temple period ==
Further information: Architecture of ancient Israel#Funerary architecture

=== Jerusalem ===
Rock-cut tombs from the late First Temple period have been discovered in several locations in Jerusalem, the capital city of the Kingdom of Judah. These include the Silwan necropolis, Ketef Hinnom, the Garden Tomb, and St. Etienne.

==== Silwan Necropolis ====
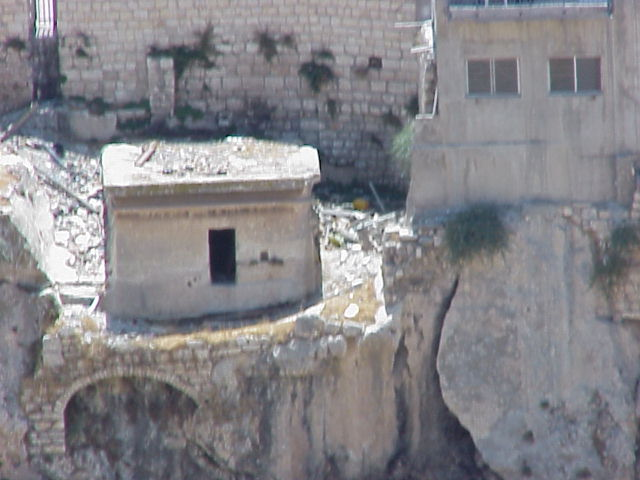
Remnants of the Monolith of Silwan, a First Temple period tomb.

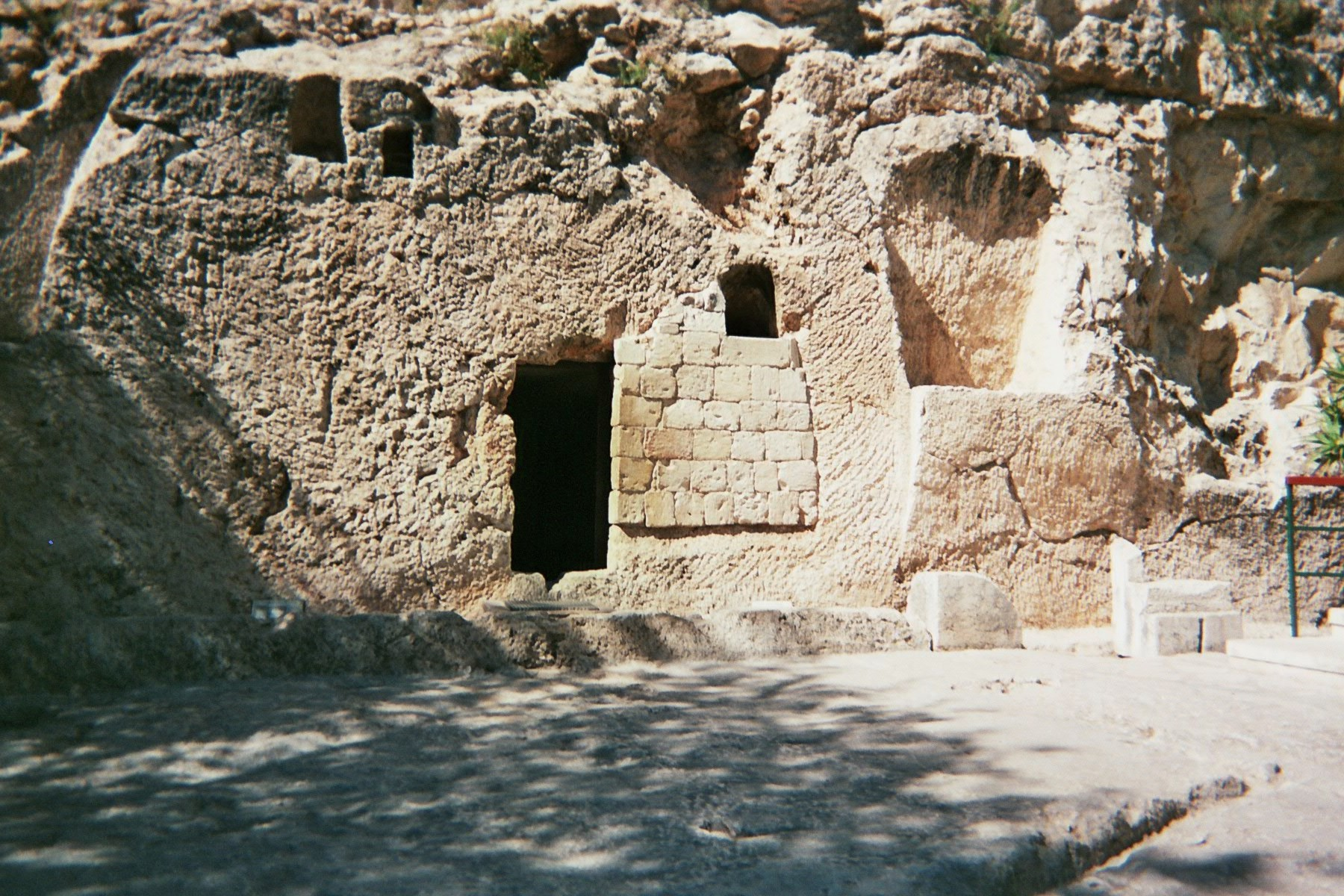
The so-called Garden Tomb (9th–7th century BCE)

The Silwan necropolis, the most important cemetery of the First Temple period, is located in the Kidron Valley across from the City of David, in the lower part of the ridge where the village of Silwan now stands. Assumed to have been used by the highest-ranking officials residing in Jerusalem, its tombs were cut between the 9th and 7th centuries BCE.

David Ussishkin wrote that the architecture of the tombs and the manner of burial is different "from anything known from contemporary Palestine. Elements such as entrances located high above the surface, gabled ceilings, straight ceilings with a cornice, trough-shaped resting-places with pillows, above-ground tombs, and inscriptions engraved on the facade appear only here." The stone benches on which bodies were laid out and the small square entrance doors are similar to those found elsewhere in Judah. Ussishkin believes that the architectural similarity to building styles of the Phoenician cities validates the Biblical description of Phoenician influence on the Israelite kingdoms.

There are three different types of tombs in the Silwan necropolis, each type concentrated in one specific area. Seven of the tombs feature gabled ceilings and extremely fine stonework. Ussishkin described them as "among the most beautifully rock-cut tombs known in the Jerusalem area even when compared with tombs of later periods." In contrast with the extensive family tombs of later periods, these are for single or double burials, with only one of the seven having room for three bodies. Later destruction has effaced the original doorways. A second tomb type described by Ussishkin has flat ceilings and one, two, or three chambers of well-dressed stone carefully squared into spacious rooms. One features a rear chamber of especially "impressive" scale and quality. There are tombs combining characteristics of the two described here above. The third type consists of just three "magnificent" monolith tombs, now located in the northern part of the village. These have been carved out of the cliff to create free-standing buildings above the underground burial chambers. Hebrew inscriptions survive on these three tombs; these are the only ancient inscriptions that survive in Silwan.

== Second Temple period ==
Rock-cut tombs, which had been absent from Judea since the First Temple period, made a comeback during the Hasmonean era of the Second Temple period, but they were only used by the elites.

=== Primary burials ===
At the beginning of the Hasmonean period, under the influence of Hellenistic burial customs from Marisa, members of the elite were buried in wooden coffins inside shafts known in Latin as loculi and in Hebrew as kokhim. Later, in the area of Jerusalem, primary burials took place either in kokhim, or in arched niches known in Latin as arcosolia.

However, the regular type of burial during the Early Roman period (c. 63 BCE – 70 CE), used by the non-elite population, was done in trenches. Trench burials were quite varied, with one or two bodies, either in primary or secondary burial, with even a case of an infant buried in a jar coming to light. If such a simple grave was hewn into the rock, archaeologists speak of a cist tomb (Keddie 2019, p. 227).

Some support the theory that in the Galilee, rock-cut tombs only had a comeback after the destruction of Jerusalem and the influx of refugees from Judaea after 70 CE (Keddie 2019, p. 237).

=== Secondary burials ===
Elite burials happened in two phases, the second burial consisting in collecting the bones after the decomposition of the body and placing them in specific places within the tomb – a procedure known as ossilegium. During the early Hasmonean period at Jericho, the bones were placed back in the primary burial niches or on benches. Around 20–15 BCE, Judaean elites started using ossuaries made of limestone, a custom that continued in the Jerusalem area until little after 70 CE (Keddie 2019, p. 230). The very large, monumental tombs of elite families from the Late Hellenistic period, often capped by pyramids or accompanied by impressive markers known as nefesh, are giving way in the Early Roman period to such enhanced by elaborate and refined facade relief decorations (Keddie 2019, p. 229).

=== Jerusalem ===
During the Second Temple period, Jerusalem was encircled by a belt of rock-cut tombs, which were built outside the walls of the city of Jerusalem in every direction, but predominantly to the north and south of the city. The tombs extend as far as 7 km from the city walls, with the more prestigious tombs located close to the city. This necropolis was established during the Hellenistic period but underwent significant growth during the Herodian period. Poor people's graves, which were likely just simple graves excavated in the dirt, have not been preserved, and the roughly 800 tombs that have been preserved to this day belonged to aristocratic and middle-class families.

The most elaborate group of tombs was in the Kidron Valley across from the Temple Mount. These include the Tomb of Benei Hezir, that belonged to a priestly family also known from the Hebrew Bible, with the adjacent so-called Tomb of Zechariah monument (actually not a tomb), and the Tomb of Absalom along with the Cave of Jehoshaphat located behind it.

Among the notable tombs are the Jason's Tomb, a large, elaborate, family tomb with multiple chambers and inscriptions in both Hebrew and Greek and the impressive sepulcher monument popularly known as the Tombs of the Kings, which is actually the tomb of Queen Helena of Adiabene and her relatives. Constructed circa 50 CE, this is the only funeral monument that can be positively recognized which was recorded by ancient writers, such as Josephus, Pausanias, Eusebius, and Jerome.

The elaborate Tombs of the Sanhedrin lie to the north of the city. They were so called by later generations because the largest of them contains 70 chambers with burial benches, and the Sanhedrin had seventy members. Each of the three tombs would actually have contained the burials of a single, multi-generational, wealthy family. They were constructed between the reign of Herod and 70 CE.

The cruciform, 5-chamber, so-called "Herod's Family Tomb", a burial cave complex located behind King David Hotel on King David Street in a park in the general area of Yemin Moshe, is built of perfectly cut and joined Herodian-type ashlars and was found to still contain two in situ decorated sarcophagi, all dated to the first century BCE. Its popular name stuck in spite of another tomb near the Damascus Gate being long considered as the actual funerary tower of Herod's family, which again was contradicted by the finds at Herodium.

The Church of the Holy Sepulchre contains remains of at least seven 2nd Temple-period tombs, including the one considered by Christian tradition to be that of Jesus, and a relatively well-preserved kochim tomb opening from the western apse of the Constantinian Rotunda.

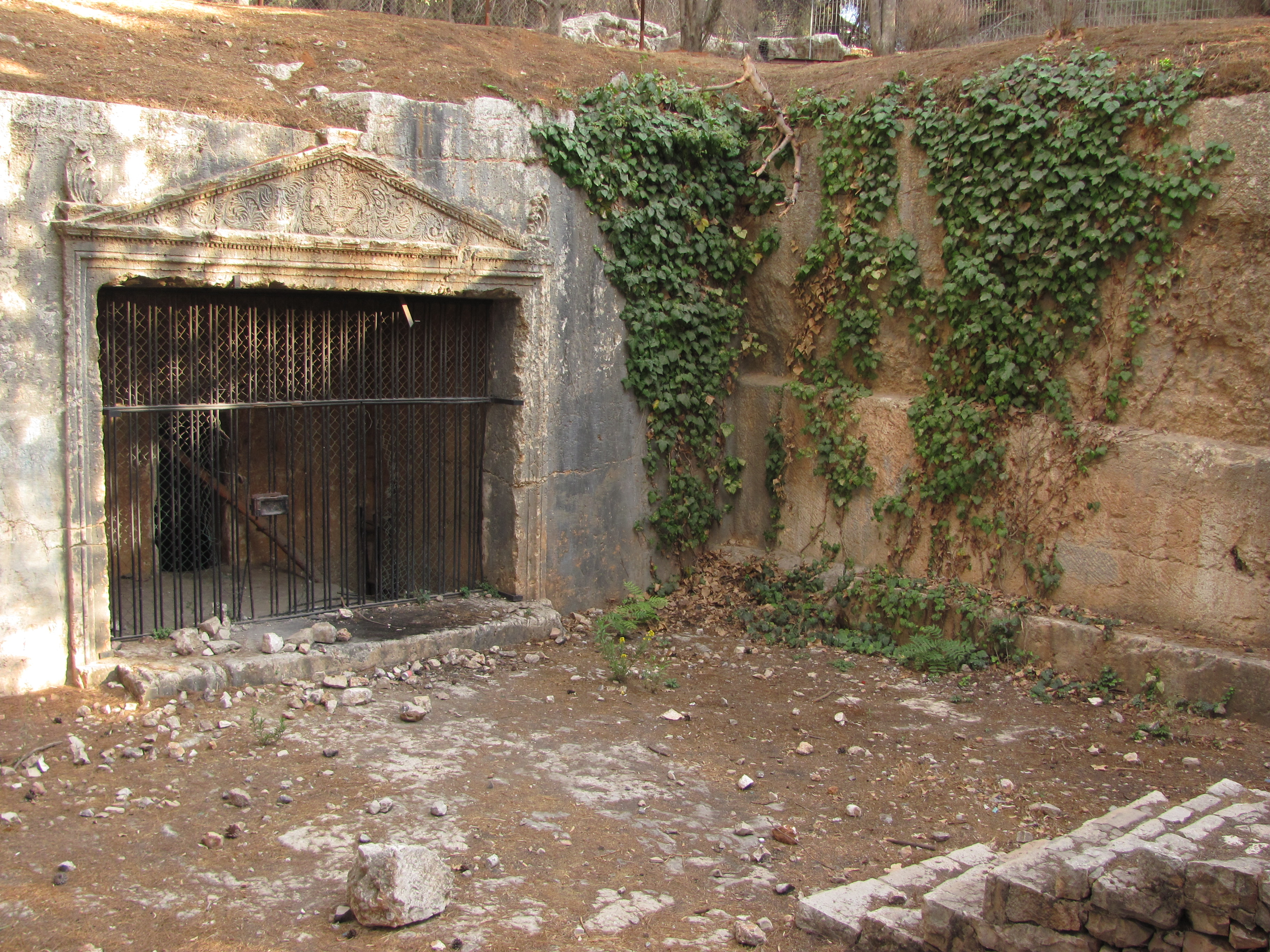
Tombs of the Sanhedrin

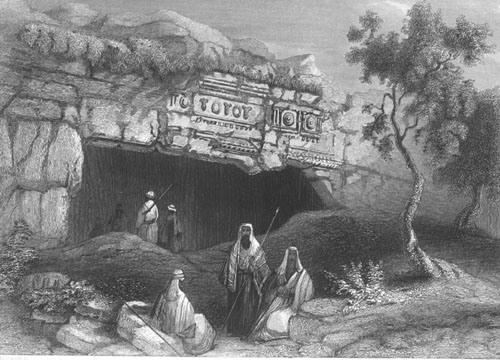
The "Tombs of the Kings", believed to be the tomb of Queen Helene of Adiabene; 19th-century lithograph by William Henry Bartlett

=== Samaria and the Hebron Hills ===
Elaborate rock-cut tombs with designs resembling those found in Jerusalem of the late Second Temple period were discovered in multiple sites in Western Samaria, including Khirbet Kurkush, Deir ed-Darb and Mokata 'Aboud, and in the Western Hebron Hills, including Khirbat al-Simia, Rujm el-Fihjeh and Khirbet el Jof. The great similarity between these tombs and the Jerusalem tombs, and the lack of a local Hellenistic prototype, have led the researchers to the assumption that the decorated tombs in western Samaria and western Hebron Hills are not the result of an internal development of the burial system there but rather the result of a deliberate copying of the Jerusalem tombs, at the special request of local, affluent families.

Most researchers concur that these tombs date from the same period as the Jerusalem tombs that were served as a model for replication, however, Magen thinks otherwise: in his opinion, the visible difference in the quality of the design and carving between the tombs indicates a chronological gap between them, and therefore he suggests dating the tombs of West Samaria and the Western Hebron Hills later than the Jerusalem tombs, at the end of the first century or the beginning of the second century. Magen also raised the possibility that their hewing is connected to the flight of Jewish craftsmen to Samaria and the Hebron Hills with the beginning of the siege of Jerusalem and perhaps even a little earlier, when the construction enterprises in the city began to dwindle and many quarrymen were left without employment.

Peleg-Barkat distincts between the rock-cut tombs of western Samaria and those of the western Hebron Hills. She asserts that while the tombs in western Samaria mimic the Jerusalem style, the tombs in the Hebron Hills show both Judean and Nabataean influences at once and do not attempt to copy the facade decorations of the Jerusalem tombs. She dates the tombs to the period before the destruction of the Temple in 70 CE, although it's possible that the practice of construction in the Jerusalem style continued after that. The occurrence suggests that the elaborate tombs of the elite in Jerusalem had an effect on the local elites in the towns and rural villages of early Roman Judaea.

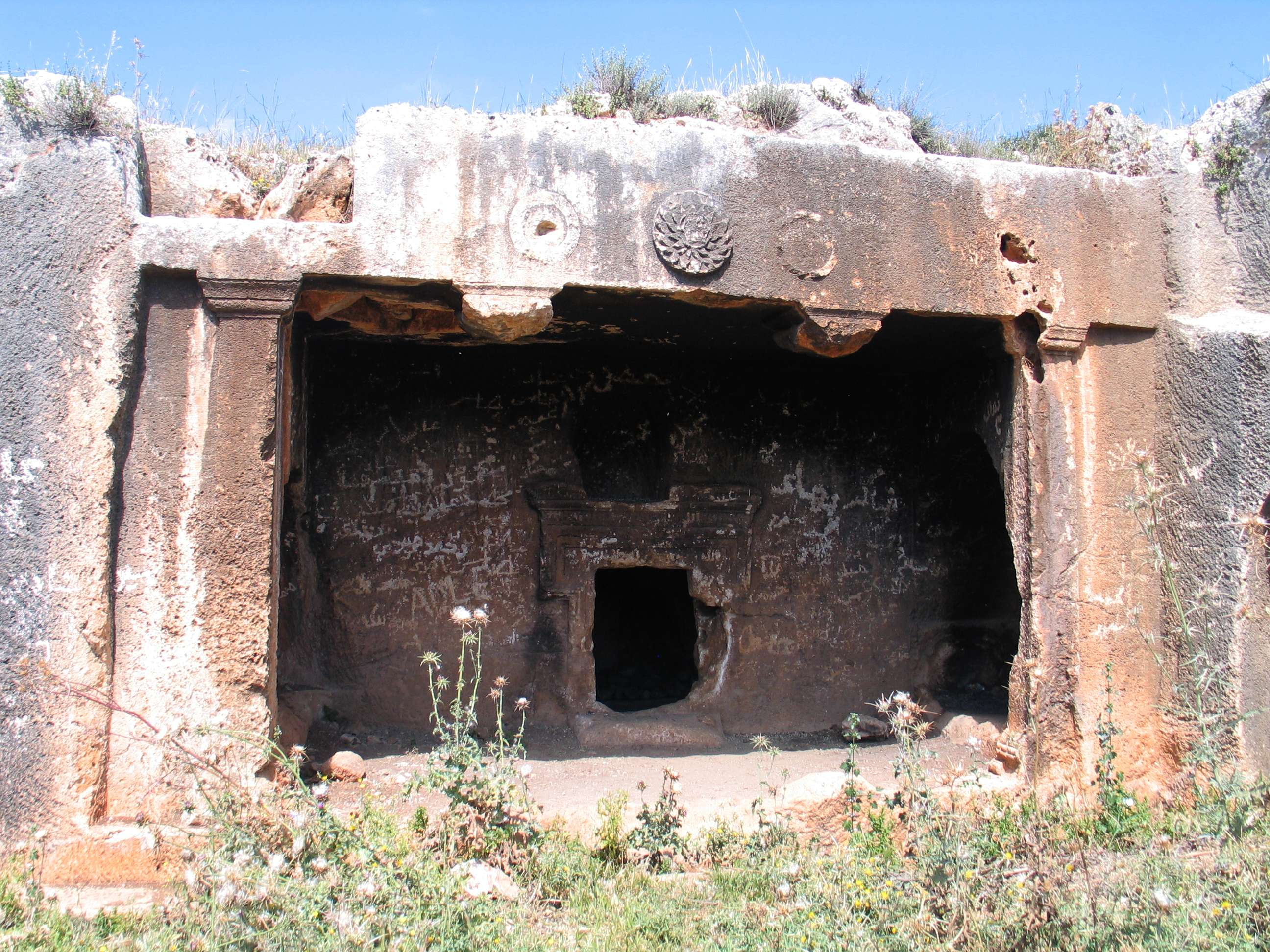
Rock-cut tomb at Khirbet Kurkush

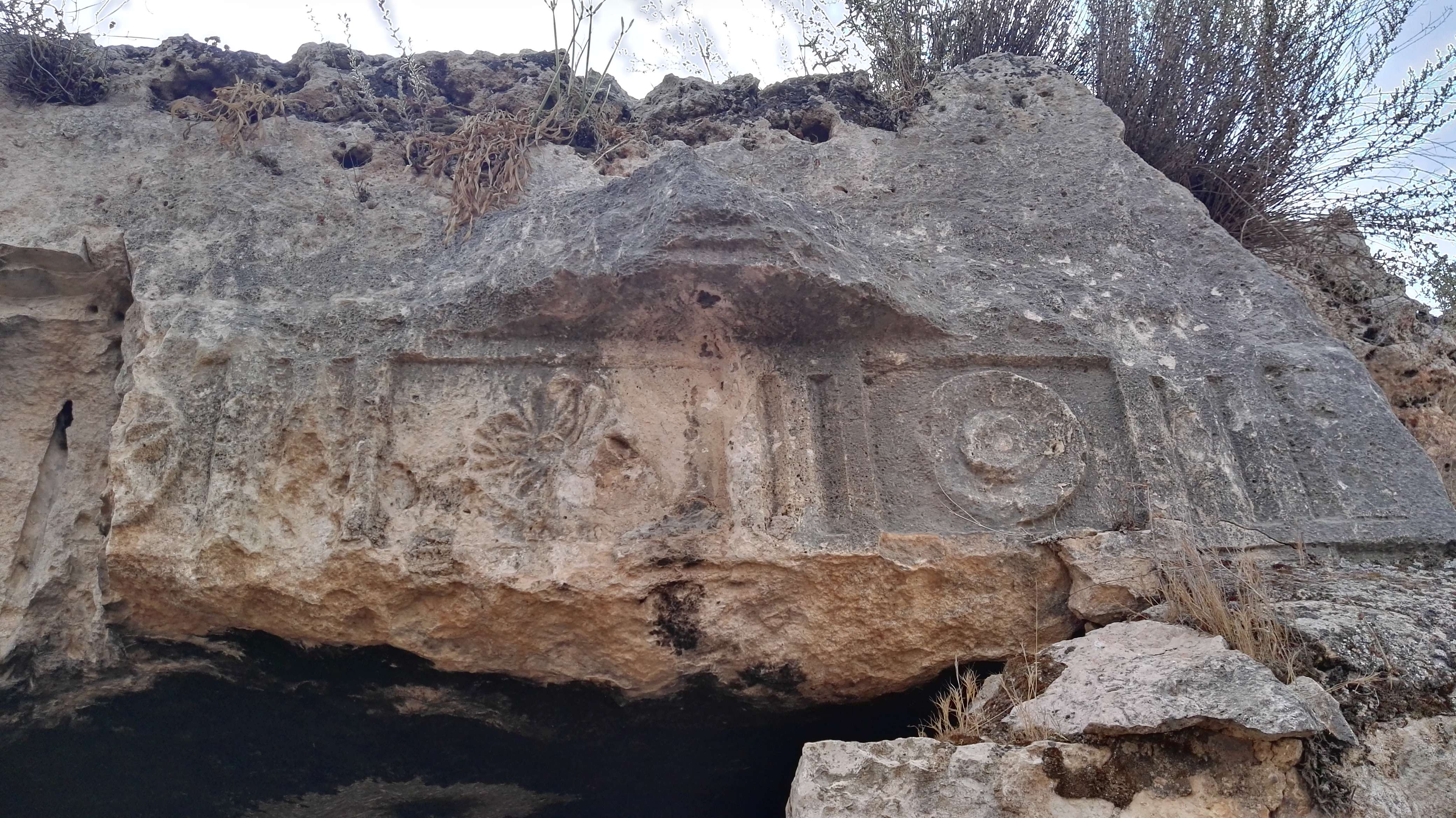
Frieze of a tomb at Mokata 'Abud

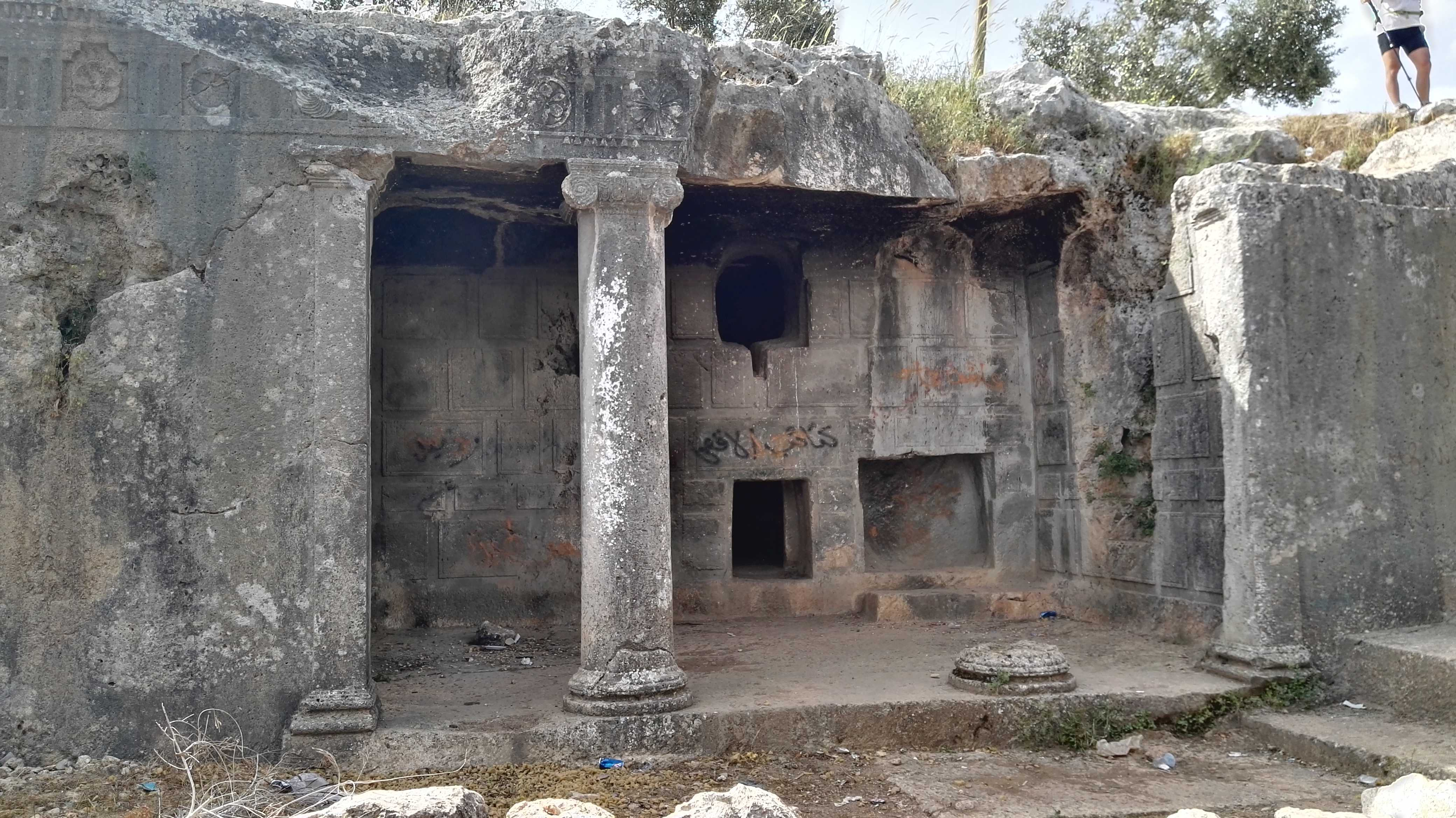
Deir ed-Darb, Qarawat Bani Hassan

=== Tomb of Jesus: Gospels and archaeology ===
The Gospel of Matthew mentions the newly rock-cut tomb of Joseph of Arimathea (Matthew 27:60).

Proposed candidates for the tomb include the rock-cut chamber inside the Church of the Holy Sepulchre, the Talpiot Tomb, and the Garden Tomb.

== Late Roman and Byzantine periods ==
=== Beit She'arim ===
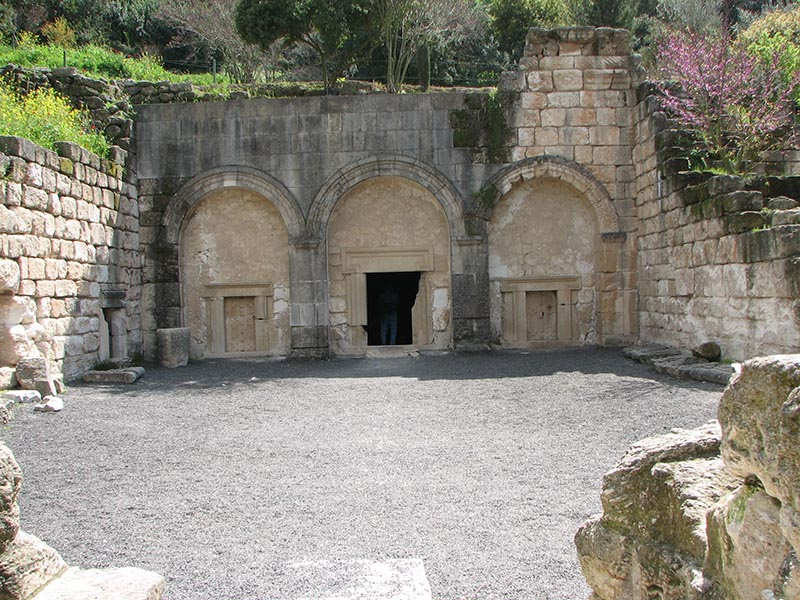
Facade of the "Cave of the Coffins", Beit She'arim National Park

The ruins of Beit She'arim (Sheikh Abrekh in Arabic) in the Galilee preserve a vast necropolis with catacombs containing a large number of rock-cut Jewish tombs from the late 2nd to 6th centuries CE. The ancient city of Besara, today known as Beit She'arim, was located near what is now the modern town of Tiv'on. According to various sources, it was one of the most highly desired burial places for Jews in the ancient world, second only to the Mount of Olives in its desirability. This prestige is attributed to Beit She'arim being named as the burial place of Yehuda HaNasi (Judah the Prince).

== Layout ==
=== Second Temple through Late Roman periods ===
Tombs included a dromos, or entry-way, through which the tomb was accessed via a descending staircase. Some tombs possess elaborate facades, with the tombs of Be'it She'arim being well known for this feature. Others, such as those outside of Jericho, had simple exteriors with a rectangular blocking stone or mudbrick. The simplest tombs feature a single, square chamber with a recess in the center with benches along its edges to allow space for visitors to stand. Into the surrounding walls, save for the side of the dromos, were carved loculi approximately 2 meters in length. In more complex tombs, an interment room followed the entrance, in which the deceased's remains were laid on stone benches to decompose. A repository served as an ossuary and secondary burial site to house the remains of the newly deceased with those of ancestors past. The repository also served to receive offerings to the deceased. The chambers of common rock-tombs were about 2.5 m × 3 m and laid out sequentially; however some had a more complex architecture of clustered and adjoining chambers – with the level of complexity relating to social status.
