= Moura =

Moura may refer to:

== Places ==
- Moura, A village in Chad
- Moura, Mali
- Moura, Portugal
- Moura, Queensland, Australia
- Rolim de Moura, Brazil

== People ==
- Moura (surname), a Portuguese-language surname
- Moura Budberg (1892–1974), Russian adventuress and suspected double agent
- Saint Moura, 3rd century Egyptian martyr

== Other ==
- Enchanted moura, a supernatural being from the fairy tales of Portuguese and Galician folklore
- Moura (album), or the title song, by Ana Moura
- Moura (grape), a name for the French wine grape 'Fer'
- Moura wine, a Portuguese wine region

== See also ==
- Mourad (disambiguation)
- Mourao (disambiguation)
