= Morino (surname) =

Morino is both a Japanese and Italian surname. Notable people with the surname include:

- Hiroaki Morino (born 1934), Japanese potter
- Jone Morino (1896–1978), Italian film actress
- Nobuhiko Morino, Japanese film composer
- Miyako Morino (born 1989), Japanese wrestler
- Yōsei Morino, Japanese animation director

== See also ==
- Mourinho, Portuguese equivalent
- Mouriño, Galician equivalent
