= Herod's family tomb =

Rock-cut tombs associated with Herod the Great

Herod's Family Tomb
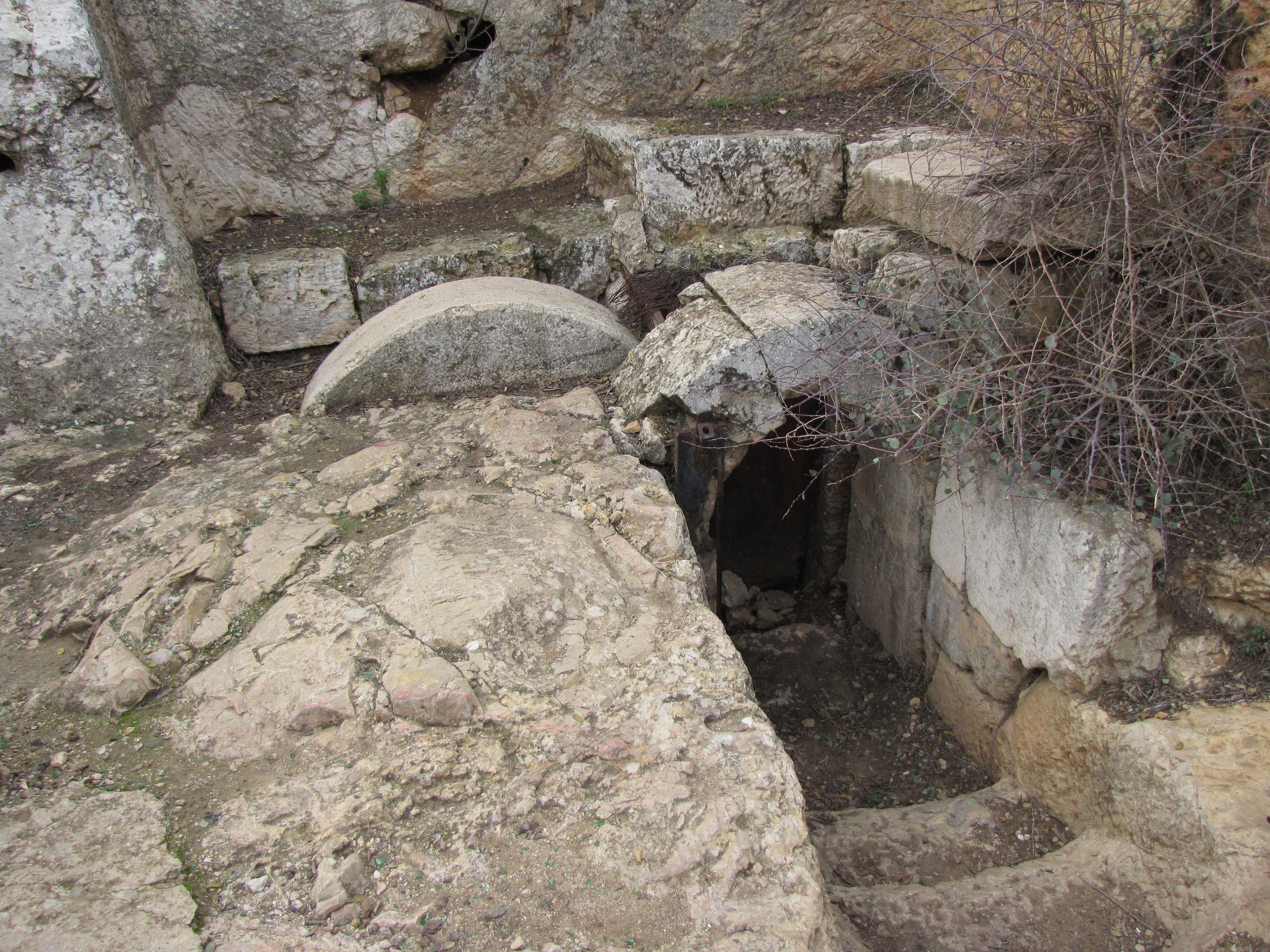
- Entrance to Herod's Family Tomb. Notice "rolling stone".
- Interactive map of Herod's Family Tomb
- 31°46′26.4″N 35°13′26.6″E
- Location: Near Old City of Jerusalem

History
- Built: 1st century BCE
- Built by: Herod the Great

Site notes
- Material: Stone, Herodian-type ashlars
- Condition: Preserved
- Public access: Yes

Herod's family tomb, with or without upper-case initials, can refer to several sites identified at different times as the burial structures of the immediate relatives of Herod the Great, one of them probably being the famed king's own tomb.

== "Herod's Family Tomb", Jerusalem ==
See also Rock-cut tombs in ancient Israel: Second Temple period: Jerusalem

The name "Herod's Family Tomb" has long been used for a 1st-century BCE rock-cut funerary complex of excellent workmanship located near King David Hotel in Jerusalem. The cruciform, 5-chamber tomb is built of perfectly cut and joined Herodian-type ashlars and was found to still contain two in situ decorated sarcophagi, all dated to the first century BCE.

== Opus reticulatum monument, Jerusalem ==
A round funerary complex discovered near Damascus Gate in Jerusalem has also been considered as the burial tower of Herod's relatives. It is known as the opus reticulatum monument, and is mentioned twice by Josephus (War 5.108, 507), as "Herod's monuments" and as "Herod's monument", respectively.

== Tomb of Herod, Herodium ==
The 2007 discovery by Ehud Netzer of the remains of an elaborate mausoleum at the Herodium fortress and administrative centre, along with the remains of three finely worked stone sarcophagi, has convinced most specialists that Herod's own tomb has been finally discovered, along with those of two close relatives.
