= David Ussishkin =

Israeli archaeologist

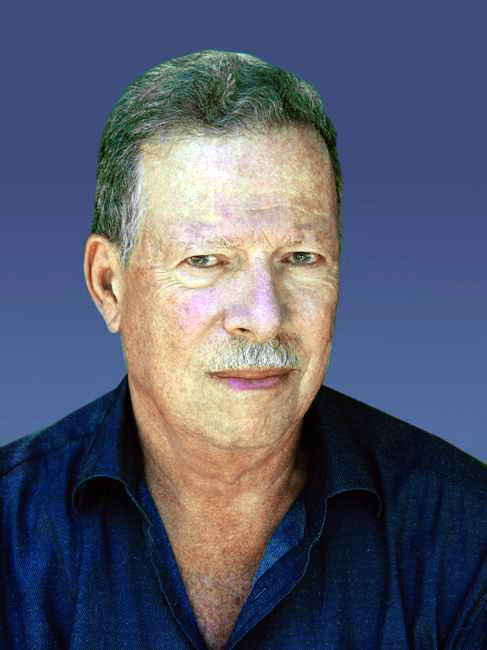
David Ussishkin, 2010

David Ussishkin (Hebrew: דוד אוסישקין; born 1935, aged 90–91) is an Israeli archaeologist and professor emeritus of archaeology.

== Biography ==
David Ussishkin was born in Jerusalem. Ussishkin is the son of the lawyer Samuel Ussishkin and the grandson of the Zionist leader Menachem Ussishkin. He studied at Gymnasia Rehavia, in Rehavia and served in the Israel Defense Forces from 1953 till 1955 in the Giv'ati Brigade. He studied archaeology and Jewish History at the Hebrew University of Jerusalem between 1955 and 1966. He received his B.A. in 1958, Master of Arts degree in Archaeology and Jewish History in 1962 (with distinction) and Ph. D. in 1966. His Doctoral Thesis on "The Neo-Hittite Monuments, their Dating and Style" was written under the guidance of professor Yigael Yadin. Beginning in 1966 and until his retirement in 2004 he taught archaeology of Israel and Hittite art at the University of Tel Aviv, receiving full professorship in 1985.

== Academic and archaeology career ==
From 1966 to 2004, he taught archaeology at Tel Aviv University. Ussishkin is an expert on the Iron Age of the Land of Israel. He has directed and co-directed important excavations at Lachish, Jezreel and Megiddo. In 1968–71 he undertook, with the assistance of his colleague Gabriel Barkay, the first complete survey of the Silwan necropolis rock-cut tombs of the Jerusalem First Temple period necropolis atop which the village of Silwan was built. Headed the department of Archaeology and Ancient Near Eastern Studies, Tel Aviv University, between 1975 and 1978. Between 1980 and 1984 he was the director of the Institute of Archaeology, Tel Aviv University. From 1975 to 2004 he was the editor of Tel Aviv, Journal of the Institute of Archaeology, Tel Aviv University.

1996–2006: Incumbent, Austria Chair in Archaeology of the Land of Israel in the Biblical Period, Tel Aviv University.

In addition to his participation in excavations, Ussishkin also conducted research and published works in several fields. Chief amongst those are his publications regarding issues of stratigraphy in different sites from the Biblical Era in Israel, works dealing with the connection between historical data and archaeological data, and his work on monumental Hittite art.

While a student, Ussishkin took part in many digs; among those were the excavations of Chalcolithic Beersheba (late 5th millennium BCE) and of the Chalcolithic burial caves in that region, under Jean Perrot; the excavations of Megiddo, under Yigael Yadin; Caltepe, in Turkey, under Tahsin Özgüç; In 1960–1961 he was Yigael Yadin's chief assistant in the excavations of the Cave of Letters, in Nahal Hever, the Judaean Desert. Documents from the period of the Bar Kokhba Rebellion were discovered in this cave, among those are some letters issued by Bar Kokhba's headquarters.

=== Ein Gedi and Masada ===
During 1961 and 1962 he participated in the excavations of Ein Gedi under Benjamin Mazar. He supervised the excavations of The Calcolithic Temple located near the Ein Gedi Spring, and later published the excavation report. This was a unique temple: no contemporary settlements have been found in its vicinity, and it appears that it was used by nomads who lived in the area during the Late Chalcolithic period. No artifacts were found in this temple. Ussishkin believed that the collection of Chalcolithic ritualistic artifacts, made mostly of copper and of ivory, that were discovered in a cache located in a cave in Nahal Mishmar, were the artifacts from this ancient temple. He conjectured that they had been brought to that cave and hidden there by the temple's priests as part of their preparations for abandoning the site, hoping, later, to return to it.

In the years 1964 and 1965 he was field supervisor in the excavations of Masada, under Yigael Yadin.

In 1967 to 1968 he was co-director of the Tel Bet Yerah (Khirbet Kerak) excavations.

=== Silwan ===
In the years 1968 to 1971 Ussishkin headed a survey of Silwan, in Eastern Jerusalem, across from the City of David. In the era of the First Jerusalem Temple, about 50 rock-cut tombs of rich and powerful people from the Kingdom of Judah were carved into the mountainside in this area (known as the Silwan necropolis/Siloam). These graves have been absorbed by the houses of the local village of Silwan. The site itself has been known for centuries, and all of its tombs have been plundered by grave robbers. Some of them had been studied before, but only after 1967 did it become possible for Israeli archaeologists to conduct a thorough survey of the site and to collect additional data from it. Three of the most stately tombs had inscriptions in the Paleo-Hebrew alphabet carved above their entrances. One of these is the famous tomb nicknamed The Grave of Pharaoh's Daughter. An inscription above another tomb states that this is the tomb of "....yehu the royal steward" (the Shebna inscription). The report from this survey was published in a book that was also translated to English.

=== Lachish ===
Between the years 1973 and 1994 he administered the excavation project of Tel Lachish. This is a site of major importance to the Archaeology of Israel. It had been one of the most important cities of the Kingdom of Judah, before it was destroyed by Sennacherib, king of Assyria, in 701 BCE. The excavation of the site was systematic and it was conducted on a large scale. The researchers focused on the layers dated to the end of the Canaanite/beginning of the Israelite periods. Simultaneously, members of the expedition began preserving and reconstructing the city gates from the Israelite period.

The data found in these excavations, together with historical data and with the description of the conquest, as portrayed in the large Lachish reliefs made by Sennacherib that were discovered in Nineveh, made it possible to reconstruct the history of the conquest and destruction of Lachish during Sennacherib's campaign against Judah, in 701 BCE (these wall-reliefs are currently part of the collection of the British Museum). This campaign was launched to repress the rebellion started by Hezekiah, king of Judah, against Assyria. Lachish was taken, after a short siege and a fierce battle, and destroyed completely. In 2004 Ussishkin published a full report of the excavation project, in 5 volumes.

=== Beitar ===
In 1984, following his work in the Cave of Letters, and due to his interest in the Bar Kokhba Rebellion, he initiated archaeological soundings in Beitar, which had been Bar Kokhba's last stronghold. It is located in southeastern Jerusalem. This site had already been known for a while. Remains of the siege works done by the Romans when they were besieging this stronghold, in 135 CE, had been discovered in its vicinity: the Roman military camps, their siege walls. Ussishkin found that in that period Beitar had been a small settlement, selected by Bar Kokhba to be his headquarters for several reasons: its proximity to ancient Jerusalem and to the road leading from Jerusalem to Gaza and the fact that it had a spring and was situated on an easily defensible hilltop. The excavations revealed the wall hastily erected by Bar Kokhba's men just before the siege had begun, and they have also discovered remains of the ammunition used by the fort's defenders: arrowheads and sling stones.

=== Jezreel ===
In the years 1990 to 1996 he excavated Jezreel together with John Woodhead, from the British School of Archaeology in Jerusalem. The excavation was started because walls from the Israelite period were discovered during development works conducted on the site. This site is key to the research of the Israelite period and its chronology. Jezreel was an important centre, probably of a military nature, of the Kingdom of Israel, at the era of the Omride dynasty—specifically, during the reigns of Omri and Ahab, his son. The Old Testament story of Naboth the Jezreelite takes place in Jezreel. Remains of the large fortified complex built there by Omri and by Ahab was discovered in the excavations. It had apparently been destroyed by the Arameans (kingdom of Aram Damascus) in the late 9th century BCE. A church from the era of the Crusades was also discovered in Jezreel.

=== Tel Megiddo ===
Tel Megiddo has been systematically excavated, by an expedition of the University of Tel Aviv, since 1992. This expedition has been headed by Ussishkin and Israel Finkelstein. Megiddo is a key site for the archaeological research of Israel. Large scale excavations had been conducted in Tel Megiddo previously but they left many archaeological and historical issues unresolved. In the renewed excavations researchers are focusing on layers from the Israelite Period, when this city had been one of the major cities in the Kingdom of Israel.

== Positions held ==
- 1978–1979 – Visiting curator, The Royal Ontario Museum and visiting professor, The University of Toronto, Canada
- 1982 – visiting professor, The University of South Africa, Pretoria, South Africa
- 1990 – Visiting professor, The University of Notre Dame, Indiana, U.S.
- 1967–1993 – Member, Editorial Board of Qadmoniot, Journal for the Antiquities of Israel and the Bible Lands
- 1985–1995 – Member, board of directors of Yad Itzaq Ben-Zvi
- 1980–2010 – Member, the Israel Archaeological Council
- 1990–2010 – Member, Excavations Permit Committee, Israel Archaeological Council
- Since 1976 – Member, board of directors of the Israel Exploration Society
- Since 1985 – Member of the Archaeological Council for Judea and Samaria

== Selected publications ==
- The conquest of Lachish by Sennacherib, Institute of Archaeology, 1982
- Excavations at Tel Lachish, 1978–1983: Second preliminary report , Makhon le-arkheÊ¾ologyah Reprint series - Tel Aviv University, Institute of Archaeology, 1983
- The Village of Silwan, The Necropolis from the Period of the Judean Kingdom, Jerusalem, 1993 (Hebrew edition - 1983).
- Studies In The Iron Age Pottery Of Israel: Typological, Archaeological And Chronological Aspects, with Orna Zimhoni, O. Zimhoni, and Lily Singer-Avitz, 1997
- Megiddo Iii, Set: The 1992–1996 Season (Monograph Series of Sonia & Marco Nadler, Institute of Archaeology) with Israel Finkelstein and Baruch Halpern, 2000
- The Renewed Archaeological Excavations at Lachish (1973–1994), Volumes I–V, 2005
