= Enchanted moura =

Figure of Portuguese and Galician legend

The enchanted moura or moura encantada (enchanted female mouro) is a supernatural being from the fairy tales of Portuguese and Galician folklore. Very beautiful and seductive, she lives under an imposed occult spell. Shapeshifters, the mouras encantadas occupy liminal spaces and are builders with stone of formidable strength.

An enchanted moura would often appear singing and using a golden comb on her long hair, which is either golden or black, though in Galicia, they are more commonly redheads. She promises to give treasures to whoever sets her free by breaking her spell.

According to José Leite de Vasconcelos, mouras encantadas are “beings compelled by an occult power to live on a certain state of siege as if they were numb or asleep, insofar as a particular circumstance does not break their spell". According to ancient lore, they are the souls of young maidens who were left guarding the treasures that the males, mouros encantados (enchanted mouros), hid before heading to Mourama.

== In legend ==
The legends describe mouras encantadas as young maidens of great beauty or as charming princesses who are "dangerously seductive".

They are shapeshifters and there are a number of legends, and versions of the same legend, as a result of centuries of oral tradition. They appear as guardians of the pathways into the earth and of the "limit" frontiers where it was believed that the supernatural could manifest itself. Mouras encantadas are magical maidens who guard castles, caves, bridges, wells, fountains, rivers, and treasures.

José Leite de Vasconcelos considered as a possibility that the mouras encantadas may have had assimilated the characteristics of local deities, such as nymphs and spirits of nature. Consiglieri Pedroso also referred to the mouras encantadas as "feminine water genies." The tales of the mouras are part of a wider lore of the "mouros encantados", who sometimes appear as giants or warriors, which also include the mourinhos or maruxinhos, a very small elf like people who live under the ground.

== Origins ==
The fairy tales featuring mouras encantadas are thought to be of pre-Roman, Indo-European Celtic origin. They are related to other Indo-European, and especially Celtic, female divinities of the water. Almost every Portuguese or Galician town has a tale of a Moura Encantada. The lore of the mouros encantados is used to find prehistoric monuments and was for some time used in the 19th century as the main method to locate Lusitanian archaeological "monuments", as Martins Sarmento viewed these as a kind of folk memory that was erased with Christianization.

As the Mairu of Basque mythology built dolmens or harrespil, the mouros, too, are builders of ancient monuments. The Lamia of Basque mythology also sings and uses a golden comb on her beautiful golden hair, promising to give treasures or fulfill a desire of the person that manages to steal their comb (sometimes with trickering consequences).

== Etymology ==
Moura is a homonym word with two distinct roots and meanings; one from Celtic *MRVOS, the other from Latin maurus. The word "moura" (alternatively, "moira", "maura"; medieval: "mora"), feminine of "mouro", is thought to originate from the Celtic *MRVOS and the Indo-European *mr-tuos that originated in Latin the word mortuus and in Portuguese/Galician the word "morto" ('dead'). Some authors think that the mouras are the deceased.

However, the word mouro is also a synonym of Muslim. Since the Iberian peninsula was occupied by Muslims for many centuries, it might potentially refer to young Muslims slain in battle.

It's possible that this confusion in terminology may result from the Celts having mapped out their spirit world physically upon earth, similar to the Norse and Germanic peoples. The Gauls were said to have divided the world into three realms called Albios, Bitu and Dubnos (white world, earth and black world). Albios was the sky and Dubnos represented the Otherworld. Similar to how the Norse refer to the south as Muspell and the north as Nifl due to Muspell being closest to a fire void and Niflheim being closest to an ice void, the Isle of Brittannia- the furthest north Celtic controlled territory- was under the protection of a goddess, Alpi, from which the Celtic Scottish kingdom of Alba took its name. It is possible that, since the Moors came from the south, Mauros and Mauras absorbed the idea that their homeland related to the Black World and crossed their understanding of the literal Moors and the dead and gods who resided in the actual Otherworld.

== Variants ==
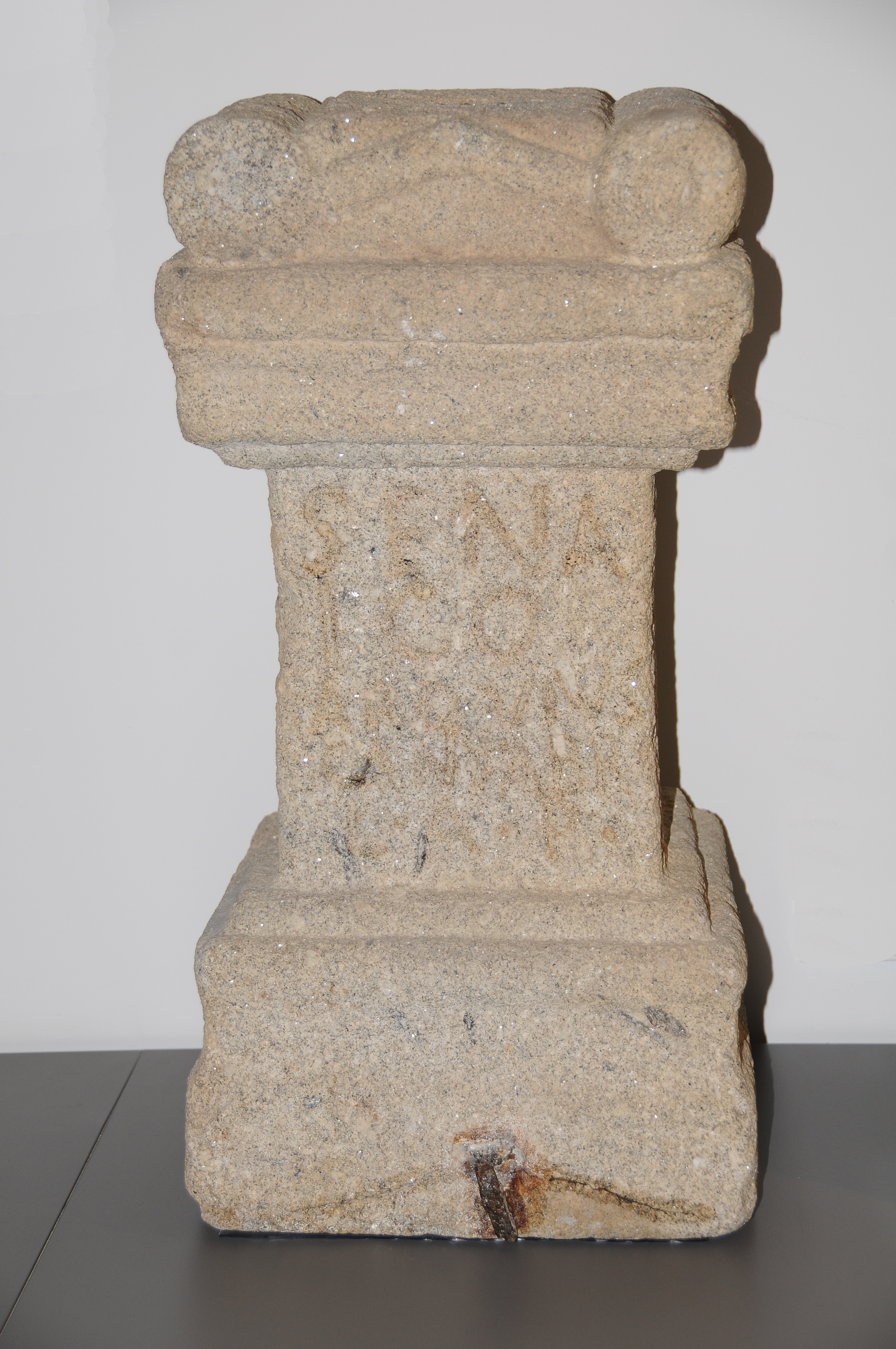
The votive ara is called "alminha dos mouros" (wayside shrine of the mouros)

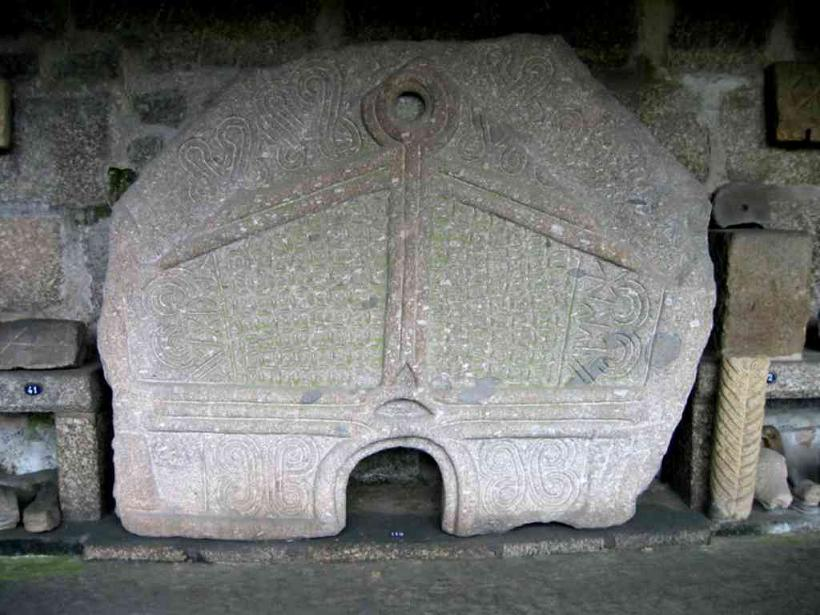
A moura-fiandeira carried Pedra Formosa on her head while she was spinning

=== Princesa moura ===
Princesa moura appears as a snake with long blond hair. In some fairy tales, the beings are beautiful Muslim princesses (princesas mouras, where moura comes from Moors) who live in castles at the time of the Reconquista and fall in love with Portuguese Christian knights. In other fairy tales, a moura encantada lives in a castle under the earth and falls in love with a Moor instead of the Christian knight. These two variations are found only in Portugal. Many of these legends try to explain the origins of a city or invoke historical characters, other legends present a religious context. In the historical context, these places, people and events are situated in the real world and in a specific time frame. It is believed that real historic facts have merged with old legend narrations.

=== Moura-fiandeira ===
In other variants, the moura encantada is a spinning maiden moura (moura-fiandeira), who carries stones on her head to build the hill forts while she spins the yarns with a distaff that she carries at her waist. Mouras encantadas were believed to be the builders of the Paleolithic hill forts, the dolmens, and the megaliths. They are believed to still live there. The ancient coins found on the hill forts were called "medals of the mouros". The Pedra Formosa found on Citânia de Briteiros was, according to folklore, brought to this place by a moura who carried it on her head while she was spinning with a spindle. They are also night weavers, but only the sound of weaving can be heard in the night.

=== Pedra-moura ===
Pedra-moura are mouras encantadas named for living inside stones. It was believed that who ever sat on one of these stones would become enchanted, or, that if any enchanted stone was taken to a house, all the animals in the house could die. It was also believed that pedras mouras had enchanted treasures inside them. There are several legends where the moura, instead of being a stone, lives inside the stone. In Portuguese lore it is said that you can walk into or walk out of certain rocks, possibly related to the moura legends. The moura is also described as traveling to Mourama (an enchanted place) while sitting on a stone that can float in the air or water. Inside caves, under rocks and under the earth, many legends say there exist palaces with treasures. According to Thurnwald (cited in McKenna, 1938), it was not uncommon among the people of pre-Roman Iberian Peninsula to believe that the souls of the dead dwell in certain rocks.

The almas dos mouros or alminhas dos mouros (souls or little souls of the mouros) was the name given to the votive aras, being alminhas the common name for the wayside shrine.

=== Moura-serpente ===
In some tales, the enchanted moura is a shapeshifter who takes the form of a snake or cobra (Moura-cobra); sometimes of a dog (cão), goat (cabra) or horse (cavalo). These moura snake may have wings and can appear as half woman and half animal and like to be offered milk.

=== Moura-mãe ===
In some tales she is called Moura-mae or mother-moura, and takes the form of a charming young lady who is pregnant, and the narrative focuses on the search for a midwife to help at the birth and the reward that is given to the person willing to help.

=== Moura-velha ===
The moura-velha is an old woman; the legends where she appears with the shape of an old woman are now infrequent.

=== Moura-lavadeira ===
Moura-lavadeira is a washerwoman but she is only seen putting white clothes out in the sun, contrary to the Lavandières who wash blood-stained clothes, the mouras are more like the lavadeiras.

=== Frades ===
Frades (lit: friars) are mouras encantadas who appear like friars dressed in white. Frades are white stone pillars.

== Legend elements ==
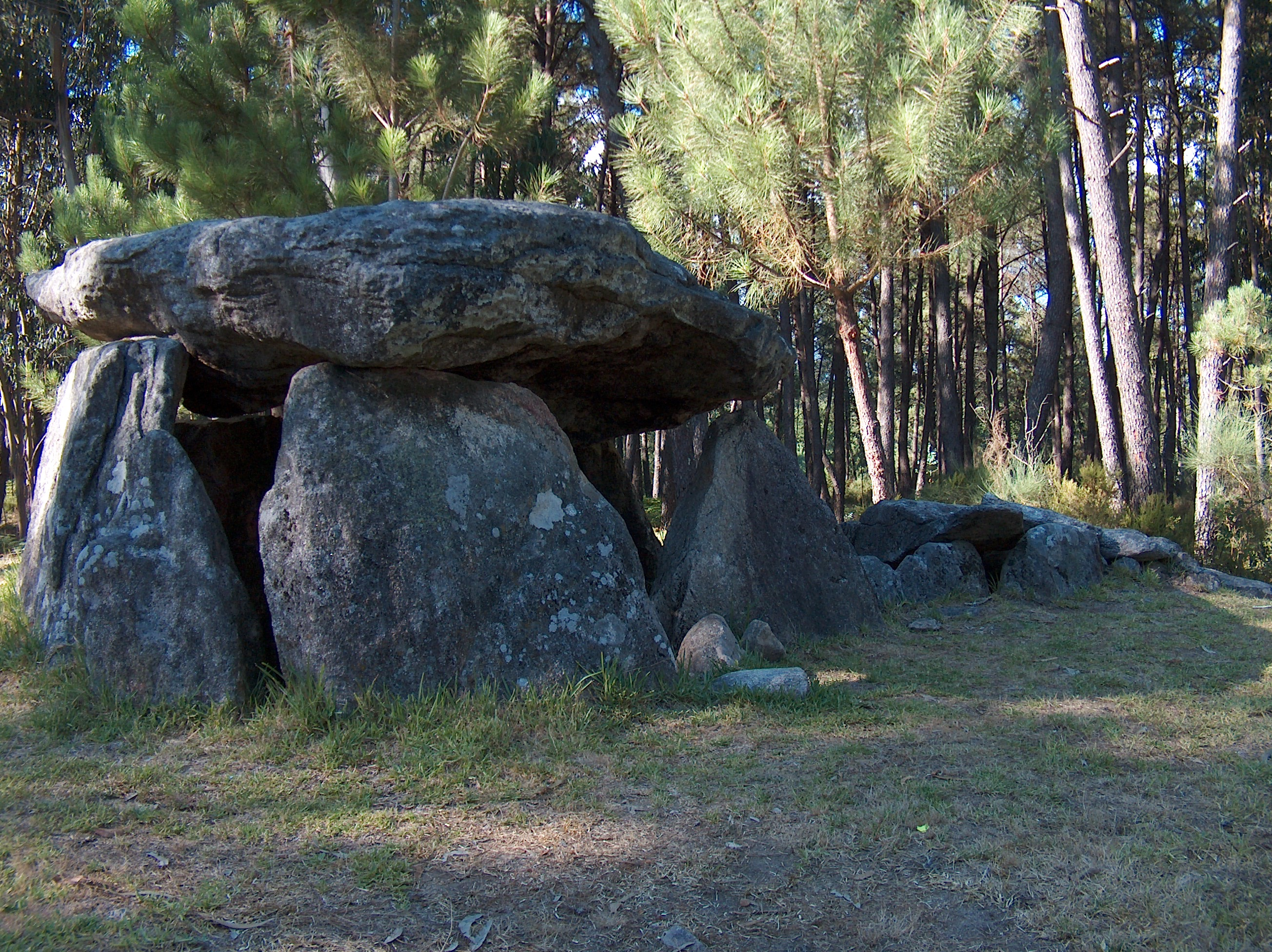
Dólmen da Casa da Moura (Moura's House Dolmen)

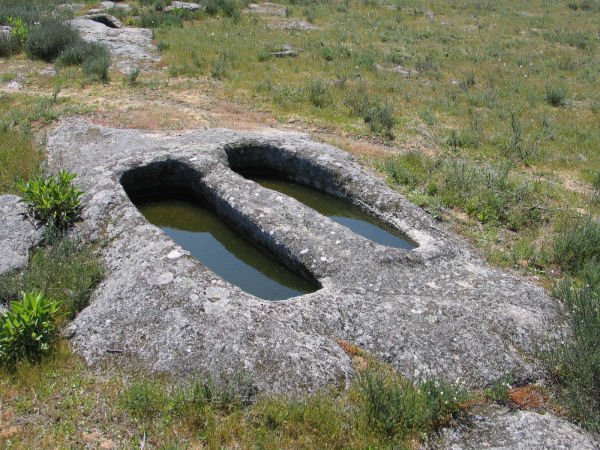
Rock-cut tombs called Masseira, is the place where the mouras knead bread

=== Gold ===
The gold of the mouras may appear in various forms: figs, coal, skirts, hank of yarn, animals or tools. There are several ways to obtain this gold: it may be offered by the moura encantada as a reward, it can be stolen or found. Frequently the gold is inside a vase, hidden inside buried pans, or other receptacles, which has raised the question that this could be related to funerary urns. When there is a pot of gold there may also be together a pot of silver and a pot of plague.

=== St. John's Day ===
St. John's Day - midsummer - is the day that it is believed that the mouras appear with their treasures and you may break their enchantment. In some legends it is on Saint John's day that the moura encantada spreads figs or a hank of yarn on a large rock, in the moonlight. In other variations the moura spreads the figs or the golden hank of yarn in the sun on large rocks. These legends are possibly related with the popular tradition of, in some regions, of harvesting the “figo lampo” (a type of white fig that were offered as a gift in Saint John's day). This day marks the date of the summer solstice, its reference is perhaps reminiscent of some pagan sun-worship or spring time deity referenced as "São João o verde" (St.John, the green one).

=== Fountain ===
The fountain is one of the places where mouras encantadas appear frequently as serpents and magical properties are attributed to their waters as the Fonte da Moura Encantada. It is also a popular custom to say to those that marry in foreign lands that he “drank from the fountain” and fell in love, as an allusion to the legends where young men fall in love and are enchanted by the mouras.

=== Enchantment ===
The state of occult enchantment of the moura herself is generally caused by a male figure, her father or some other enchanted Mouro that left her to guard his treasures. Usually it is mouros that have the power to enchant the mouras. In legends, the mouras may appear alone, accompanied by other mouras or by a male being, a mouro, that may be her father, a beloved person or a brother.

=== Disenchantment ===
To break the spell of the moura she may ask for a kiss, a cake or bread with no salt, milk, the pronunciation of a certain word, or realization of some chore like not looking at something hidden. To fail means not to free the moura and dobrar o encanto (double the spell), lose the treasure or lose the beloved moura. The legends where bread is asked may be related to the old traditions of offering food to the dead. In the same way the offering of milk may be related with the offerings made to the waters and snakes. The old popular tradition mentions that snakes like milk. One moura legend of Formigais referred to the preference mouras had for milk.

The mouras, when disenchanted may become human and marry her savior or disappear. In the legends of the cinto da moura, after the disenchantment the Mouro tries to enchant the moura again and make the moura return to the mourama.

=== Mourama ===
Mourama is a magic place where the mouros encantados live under the earth in Portugal and Galicia. It is also believed that "In Galicia there are two overlapped people: a part lives on the surface of land; they are the Galician people, and the other in the subsoil, the Mouros." Mourama is the otherworld, the world of the dead from where everything comes back. The Mourama can be compared to the fairyland.

=== Tempo da mouraria ===
In the legends it is an uncertain time in the past, the same kind of time reference as “once upon a time” of fairy tales.

=== Funerary monuments ===
Funerary monuments are often associated with the mouras encantadas. In some regions, dolmens are popularly called mouras or Casa da Moura, (house of the maiden moura) and it is commonly believed that the mouras encantadas lived in those constructions. Normally, these supernatural beings are associated with the idea of the deceased. These can be compared to the legends of the Domus de Janas in Sardinia or the "Maison des Korrigans" in Brittany. Rock-cut graves are often called "Cova da Moura" or "Masseira" the latter term meaning the place where the "mouras kneaded the bread, they are also called "cama da moura" (bed of the moura).

=== Cadeira da moura ===
Moura's chair is a monolith with the shape of a chair thought to be a royal throne. The moura sits on the chair at night and every time the moura is going to get water she carries the chair under her arm.

== See also ==
- Madam Koi Koi
- Mami Wata
- Mare (folklore)
- Mouros
- Succubus
- Xana (Asturian supernatural women)
- Engkanto
- Arganão
