= Mourão (disambiguation) =

Mourão is a parish and a municipality of Alentejo Central, Portugal. Is a augmentative form of Mouro

Mourão may also refer to:

- Rio Mourão, a river of Paraná state in southern Brazil
- Mourão (Vila Flor), a parish in the municipality of Vila Flor, Portugal
- David Mourão-Ferreira, a Portuguese writer
- Hamilton Mourão, a Brazilian politician and retired Brazilian Army General
