= Mouriño =

Mouriño is a Galician language surname. Notable people with this surname include:

- Adrián Mouriño (born 1988), Spanish footballer
- Carlos Mouriño (born 1943), Spanish-Mexican businessman
- Carlos Casares Mouriño (1941–2002), Galician-language writer
- Eliseo Mouriño (1927–1961), Argentine footballer
- Gastón Mouriño (born 1994), Argentine handball player
- Juan Camilo Mouriño (1971–2008), Mexican politician and son of Carlos Mouriño
- Marián Mouriño (born 1975), Spanish businesswoman, daughter of Carlos Mouriño

== See also ==
- Morino (surname), Italian and Japanese equivalent
- Mourinho (name), Portuguese equivalent
