= Mouros =

Figure of Portuguese, Galician and Asturian legend

According to Portuguese, Galician, and Asturian mythology, the Mouros or Moiros are a race of supernatural beings which have inhabited the lands of Galicia, Asturias and Portugal since the beginning of time.

For unknown reasons they were forced to take refuge under the earth, and now they are usually seen by people in the surroundings of castros and long barrows. The Mouros work with gold, silver and gemstones with which they make up enormous treasures that are protected by cuélebres.

The Mouros do not usually go out of their dwellings, except for taking food, and also at certain special times such as Midsummer.

Galician anthropologists had formed the theory that the Mouros are the opposite character of traditional Galician peasant.

The philologist Isodoro Millán argues that the term Moor comes from the Celtic mrvos akin to the Indo-European term mr-tuos, whence the Latin mortuus. This would relate the Moors to races already extinct, dead.

The Mouros encantados some times appear as giants or warriors, and they include the legend of the moura encantada and the legend of the mourinhos or maruxinhos, a very small elf like people who live under the ground.

== See also ==
- Enchanted moura
- Mount Pindo: a supposed dwelling-place of mouros.
- Arqueología de la ruptura colonial: mouros, chullpas, gentiles y abuelos en España, Bolivia y Chile en perspectiva comparada
