= Rock-cut tomb =

Tomb cut into natural rock

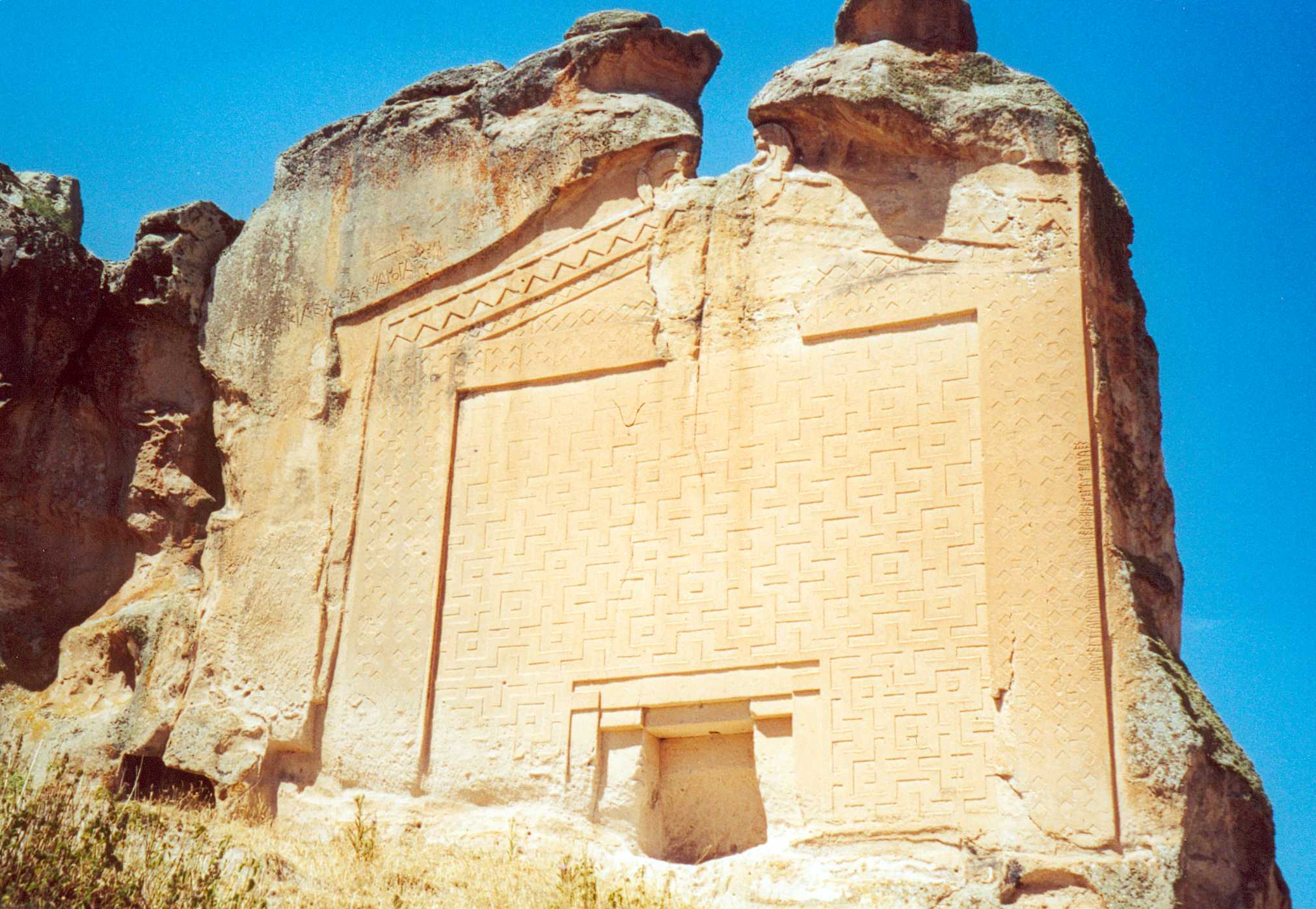
The Midas Monument, a Phrygian rock-cut tomb deba (700 BCE)

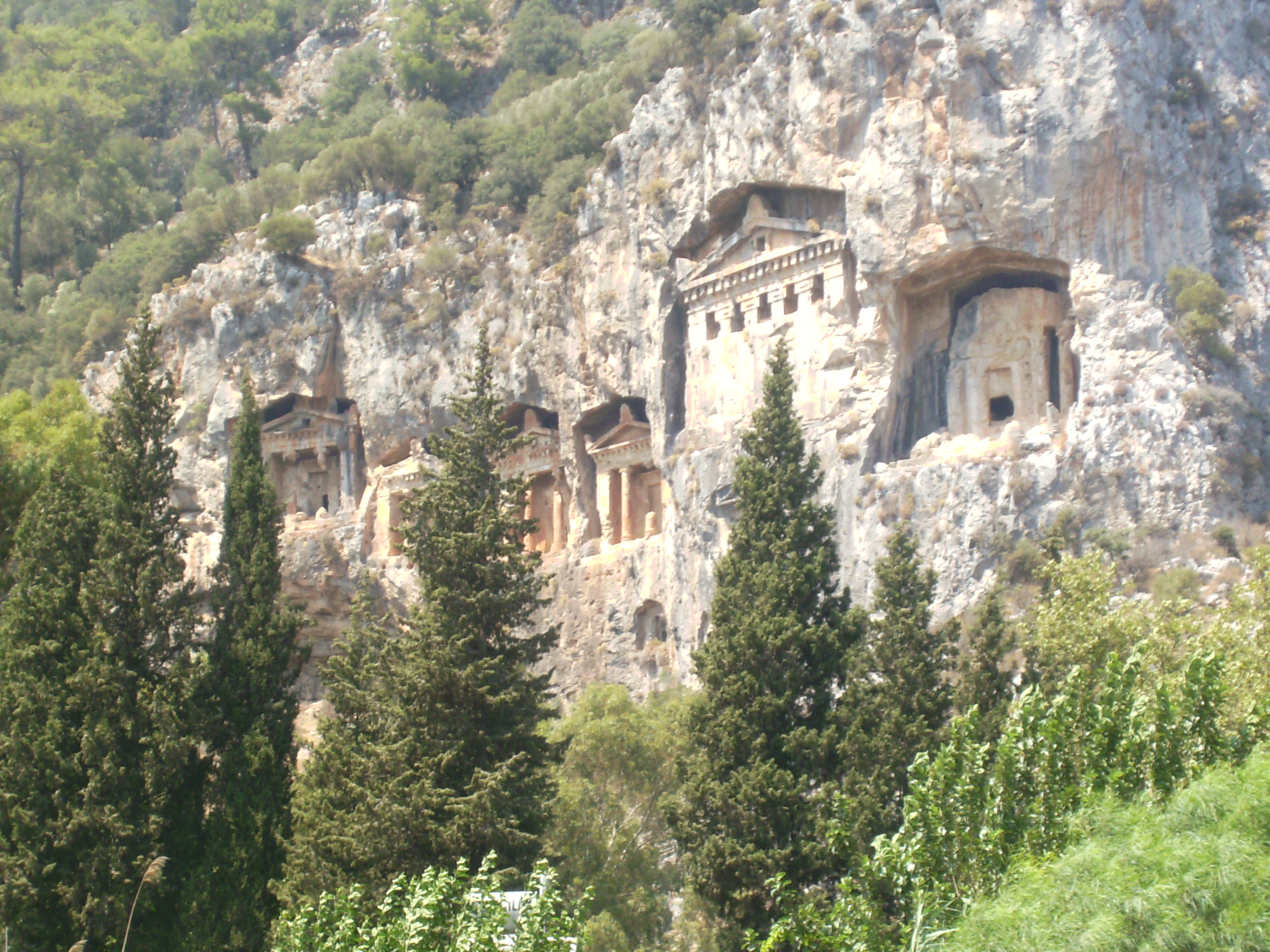
Rock-cut Lycian tombs, 4th century BCE

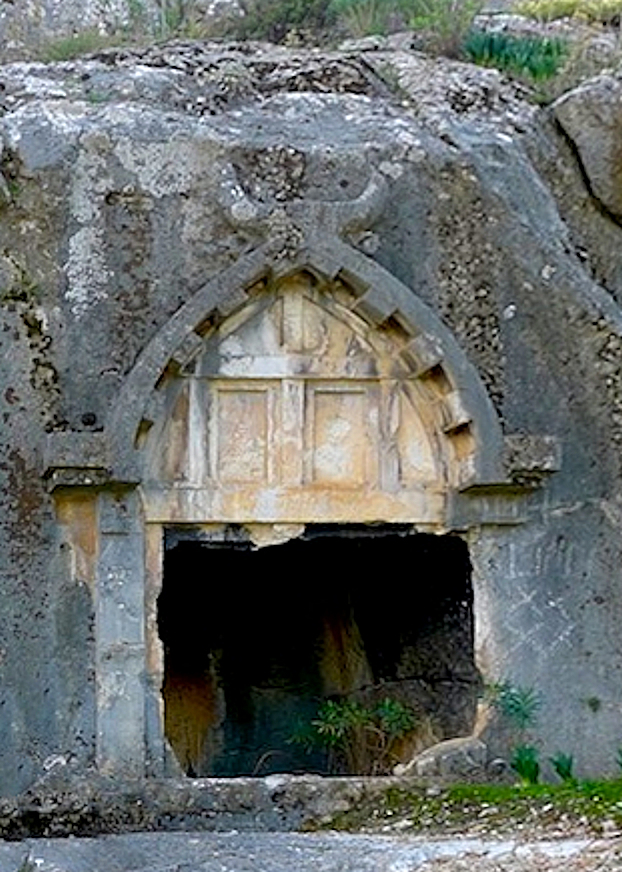
Lycian rock-cut tomb with ogival barrel-vaulted roof, 4th century BCE

A rock-cut tomb is a burial chamber that is cut into an existing, naturally occurring rock formation, so a type of rock-cut architecture. They are usually cut into a cliff or sloping rock face, but may go downward in fairly flat ground. It was a common form of burial for the wealthy in ancient times in several parts of the world.

Important examples are found in Egypt, most notably in the town of Deir el-Medina (Seet Maat), located between the Valley of the Kings and the Valley of the Queens. Other notable clusters include numerous Rock-cut tombs in ancient Israel (modern Israel and the Palestinian territories), at Naghsh-e Rostam necropolis in Iran, at Myra in Lycia (today in Turkey), Nabataean tombs in Petra (modern Jordan) and Mada'in Saleh (Saudi Arabia), Sicily (Pantalica) and Larnaca. Indian rock-cut architecture is very extensive, but does not feature tombs.

== Chronology ==
- Egyptian rock-cut tombs (1450 BCE, Thebes, Egypt).
- Phrygian rock-cut tombs such as the Midas monument (700 BCE).
- Etruscan rock-cut tombs, Etruria, Italy (500 BCE).
- Tomb of Darius I (Naqsh-e Rostam (480 BCE).
- Lycian rock-cut tombs (4th century BCE).
- Petra, Jordan (100 CE).

== Kokh ==
A kukh (plural: kukhim, Hebrew: כּוּךְ, more often: kokhim), in Latin loculus, plural loculi, is a type of tomb complex characterized by a series of long narrow shafts, in which the deceased were placed for burial, radiating from a central chamber. These tomb complexes were generally carved into a rock face, and were usually closed with a stone slab and had channels cut into the centre of the shaft to drain any water that seeped through the rock.

A kukh complex survives at the far west end of the Church of the Holy Sepulchre in Jerusalem. The church wall runs through the centre of the complex, which means that the entire entrance area has been carved away by the 4th-century church builders. Many more kukh graves can be found throughout the Judean foothills.

== Examples ==
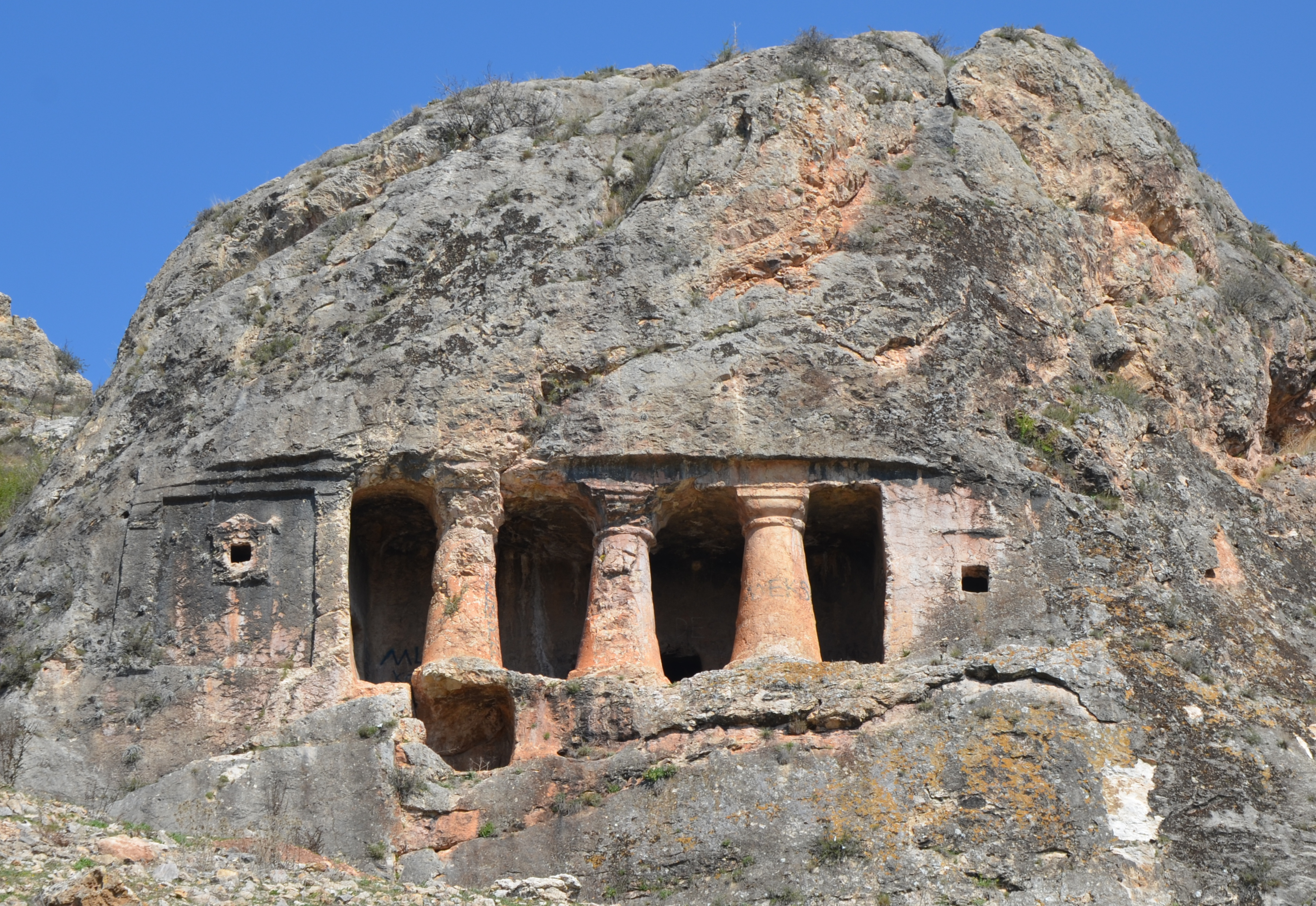
Gerdek Rock Tomb, Hellenistic period, 2nd century BCE, Çorum, Turkey

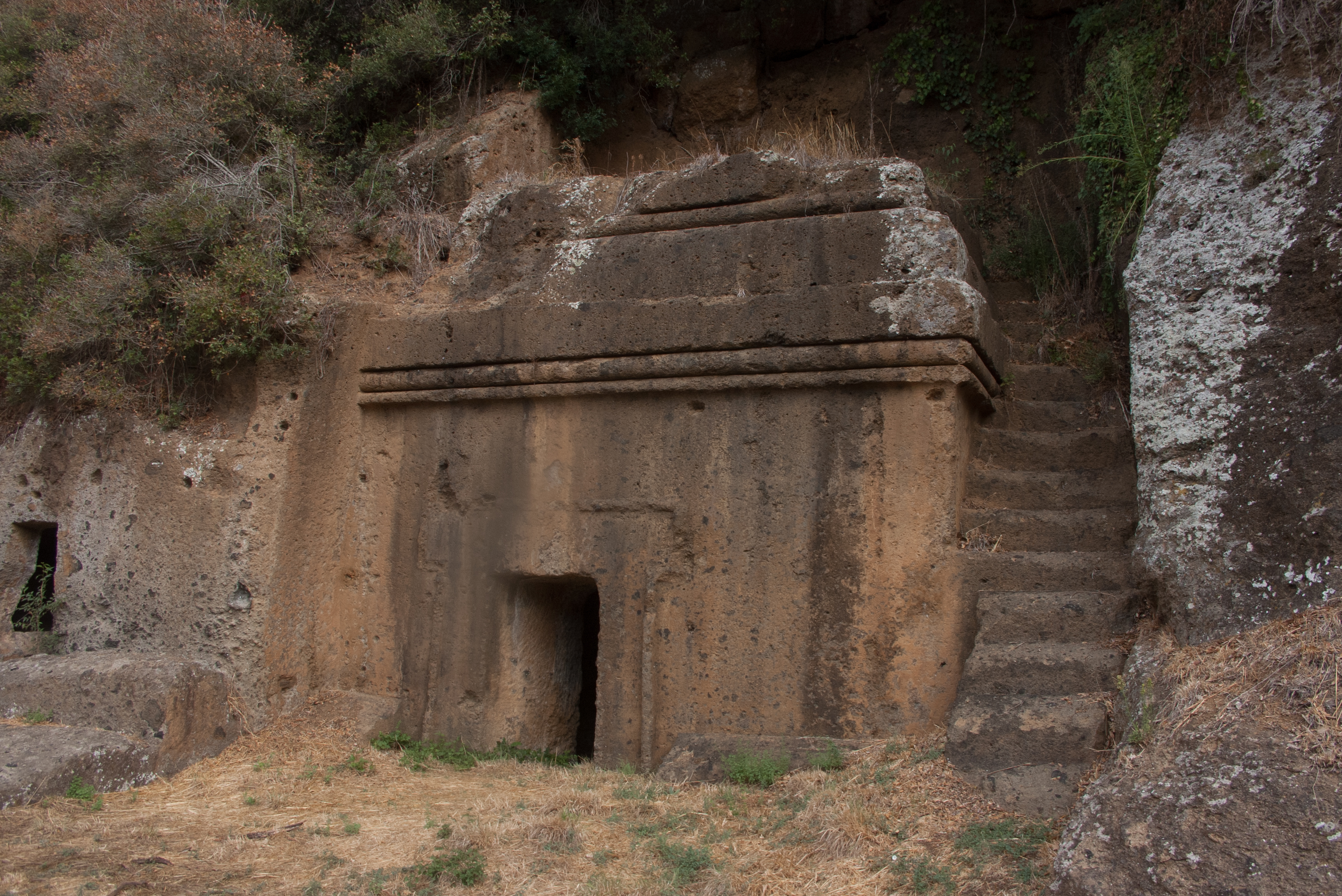
Etruscan rock-cut tomb in Blera, Italy

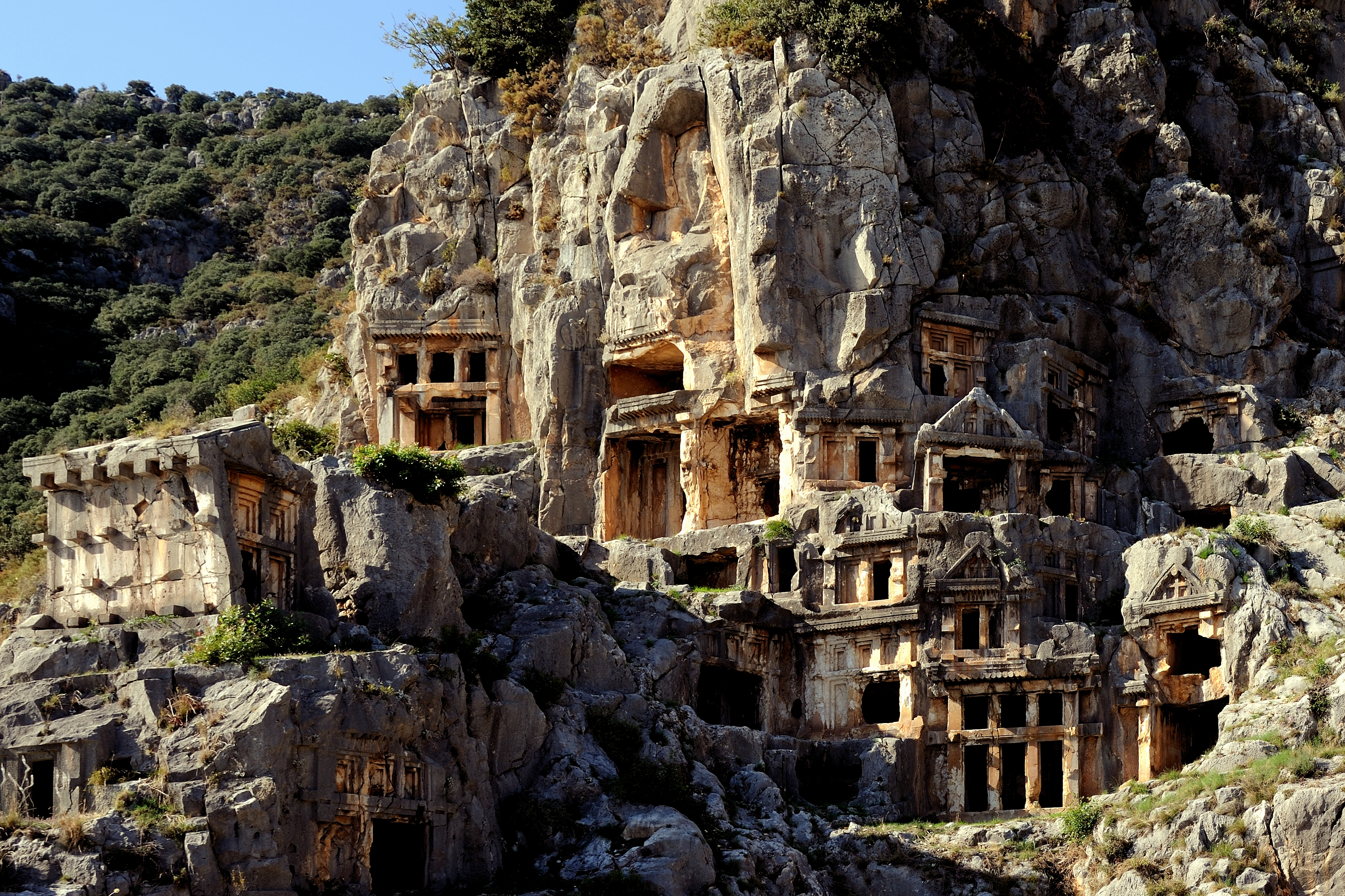
Rock-cut tombs in Myra

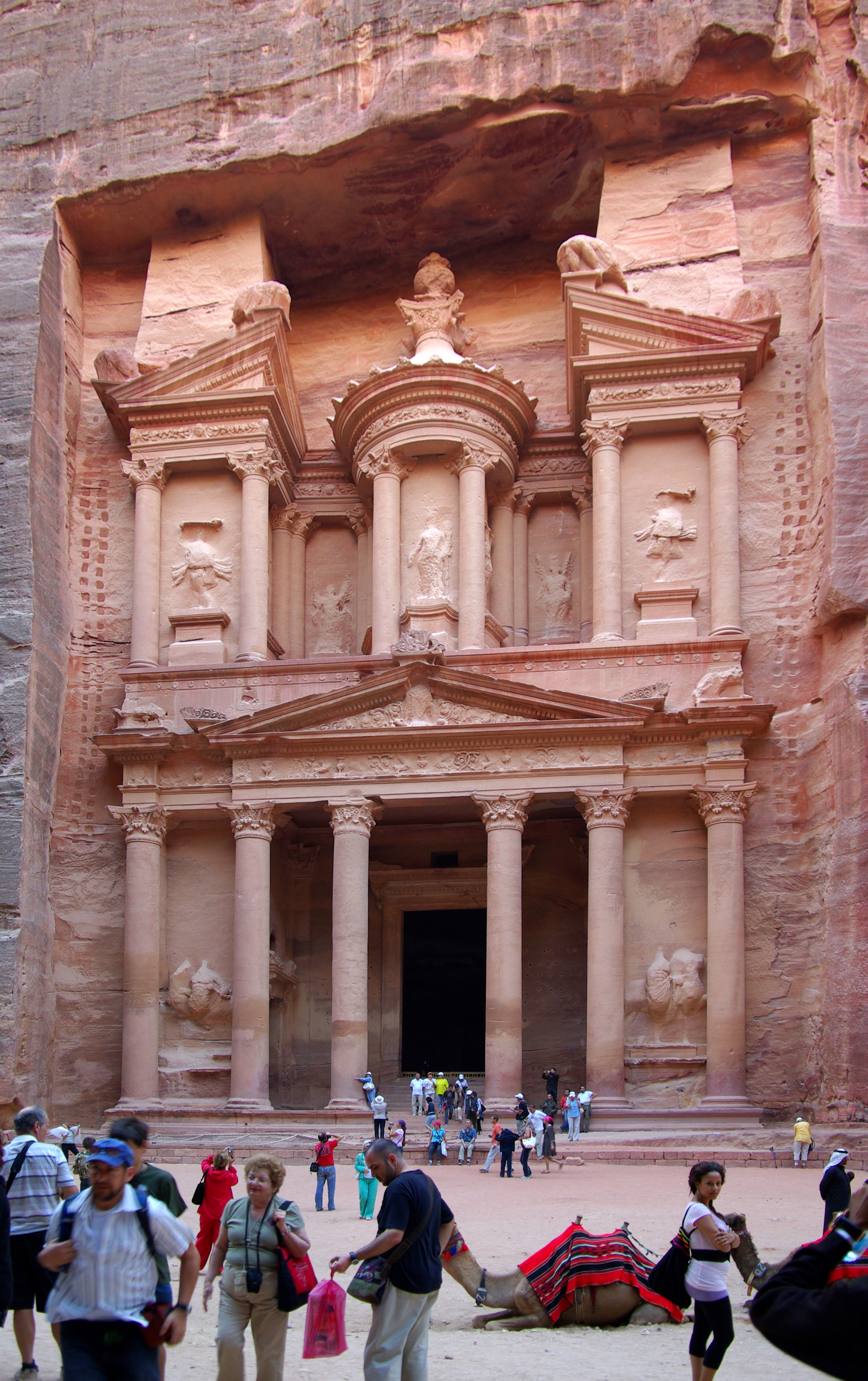
Al Khazneh or the Treasury at Petra

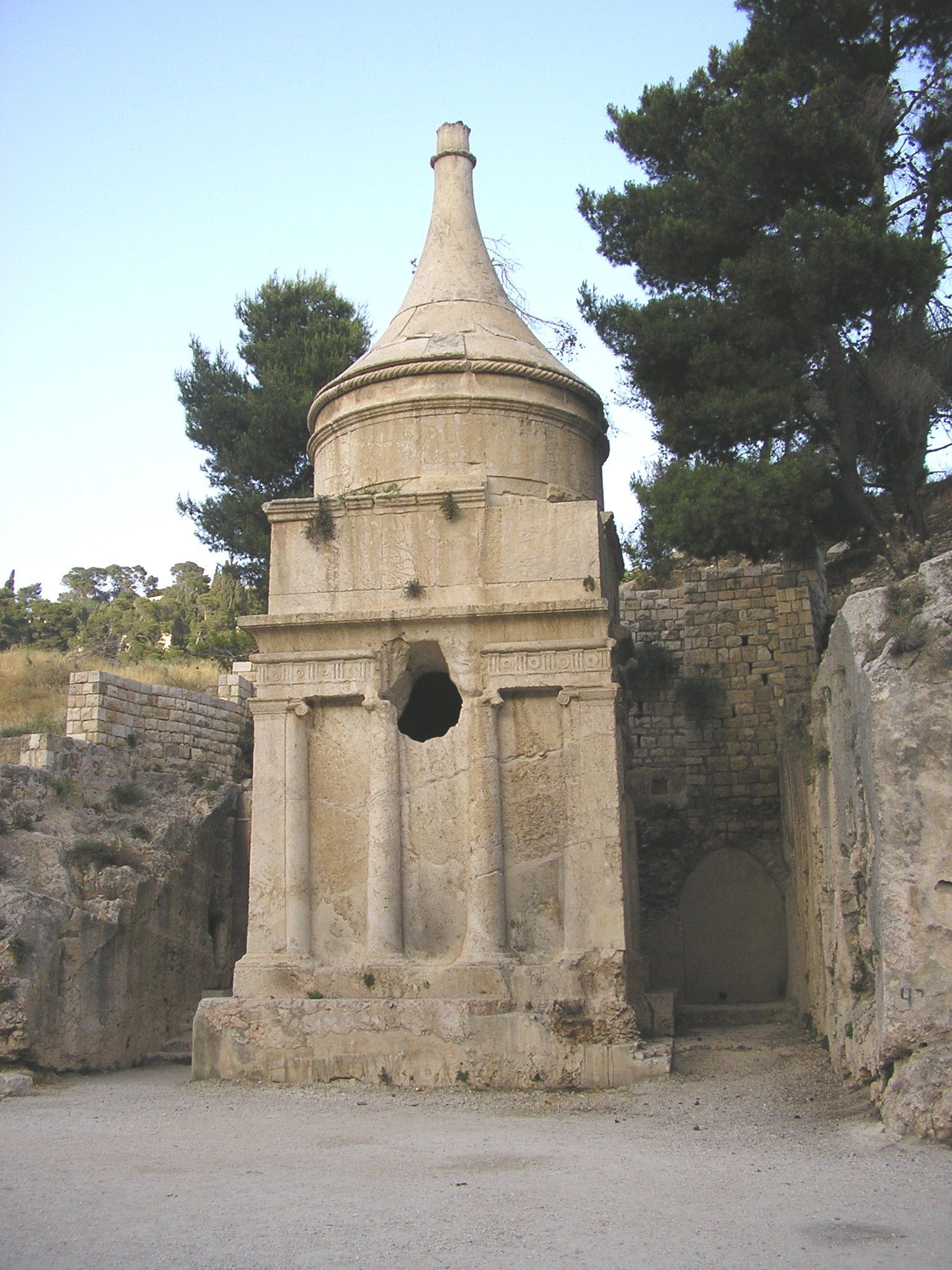
Tomb of Absalom in Jerusalem

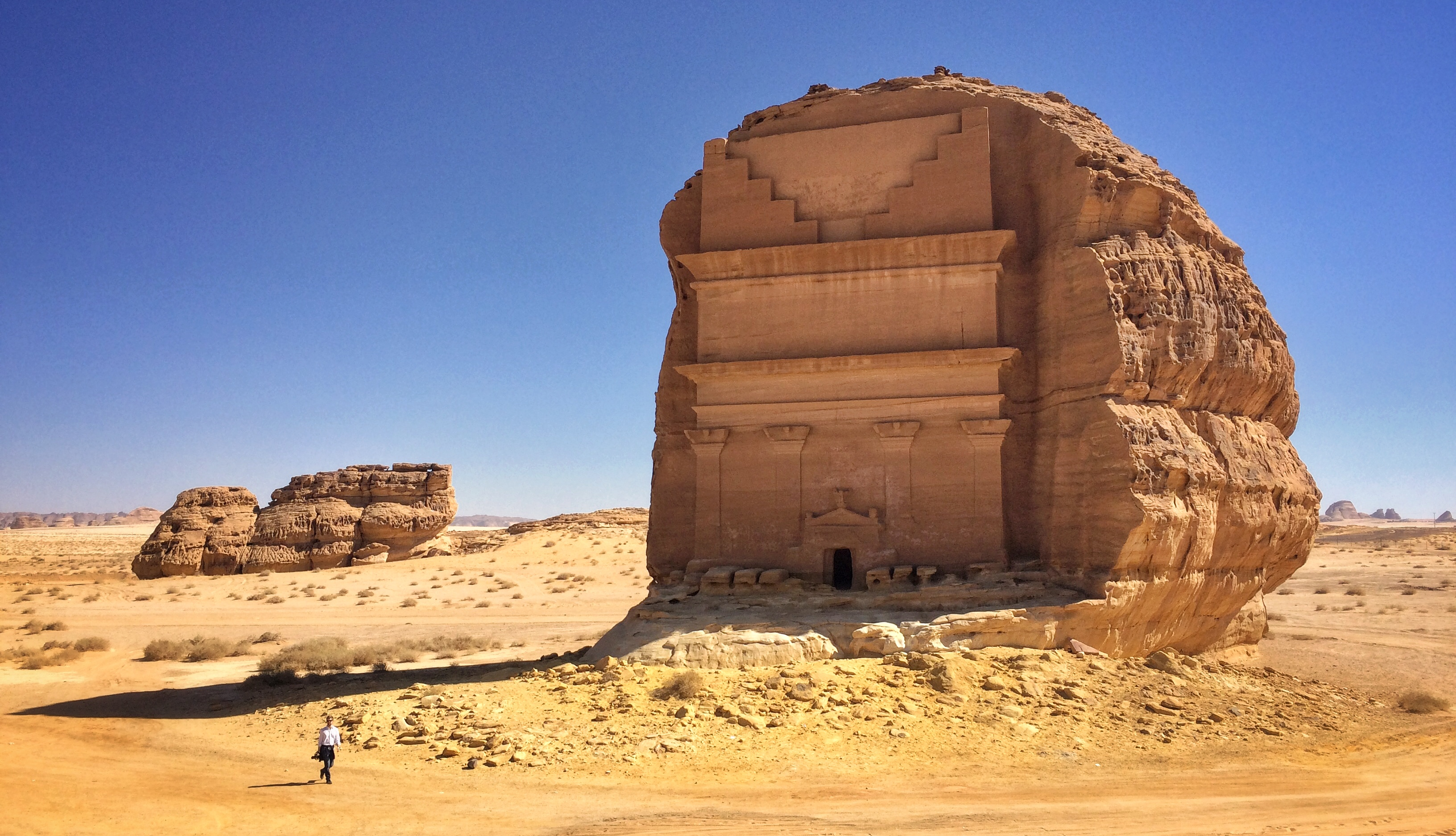
Qasr al-Farid, tomb in the archeological site of Mada'in Saleh, Al-'Ula, Hejaz, Saudi Arabia (1st century CE)

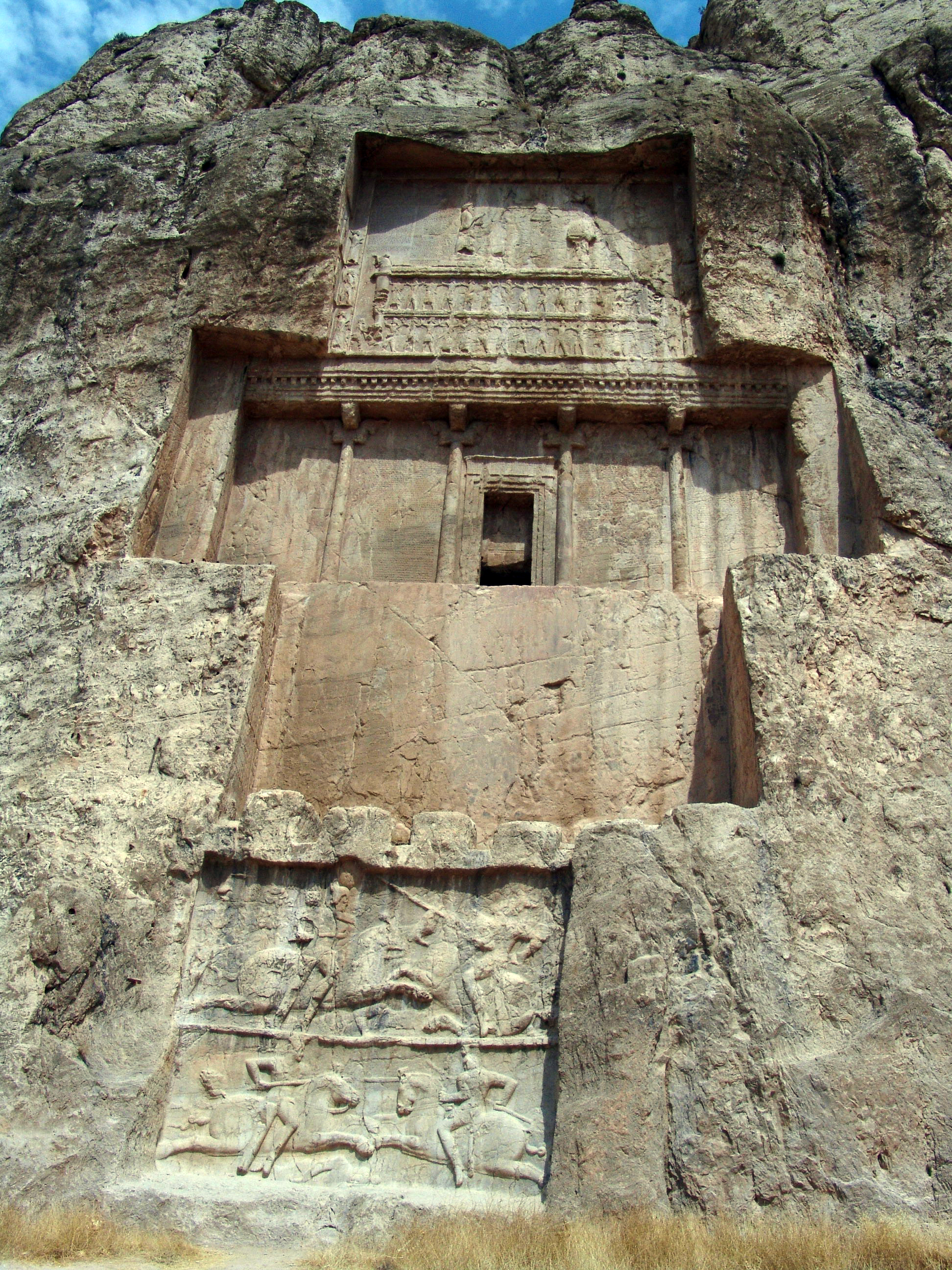
Tomb of Darius the Great, part of the ancient Naqsh-e Rostam Necropolis, Iran

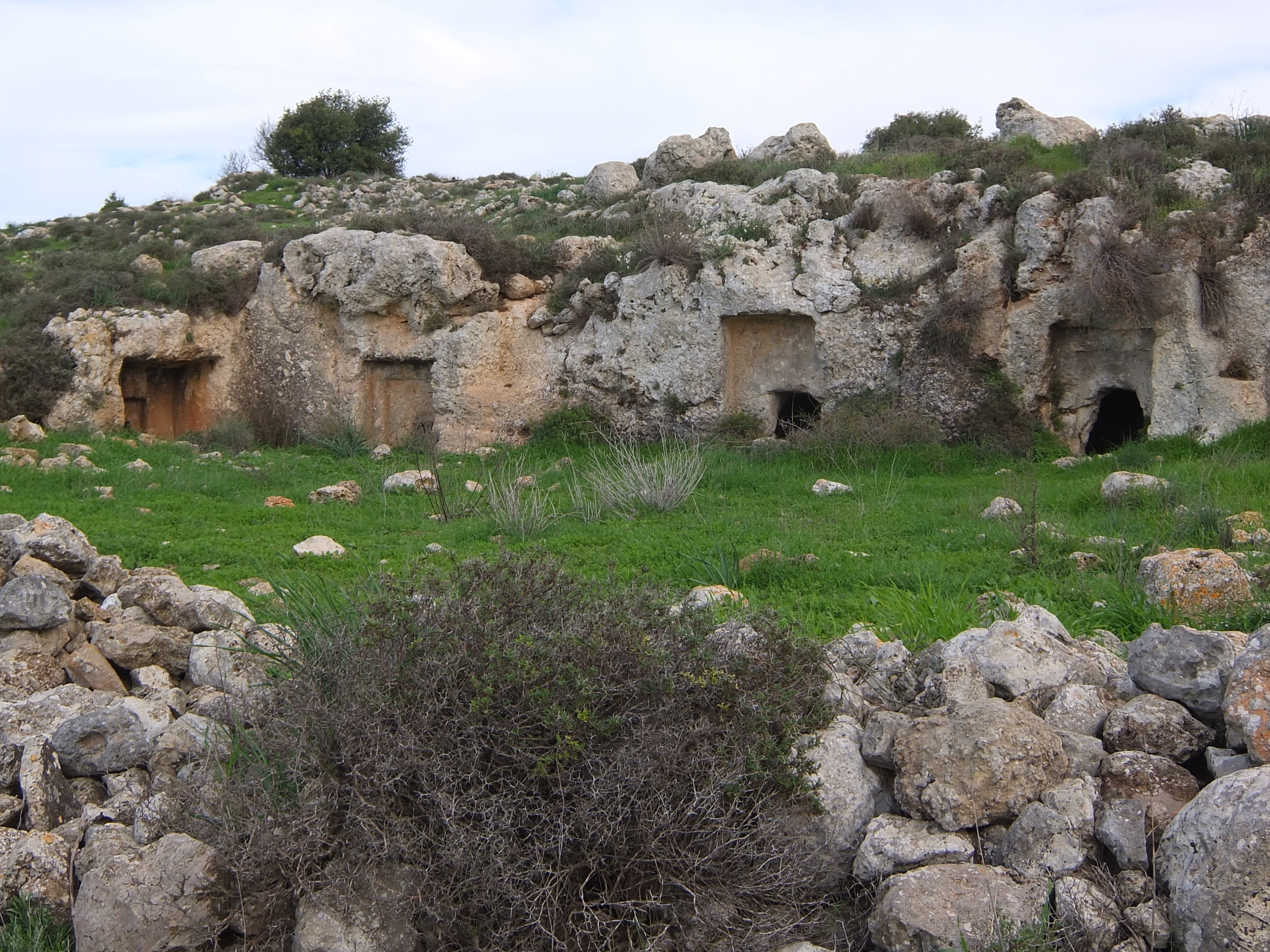
Kokhim: sepulchres (burial shafts) in Khirbet Jurish, Israel

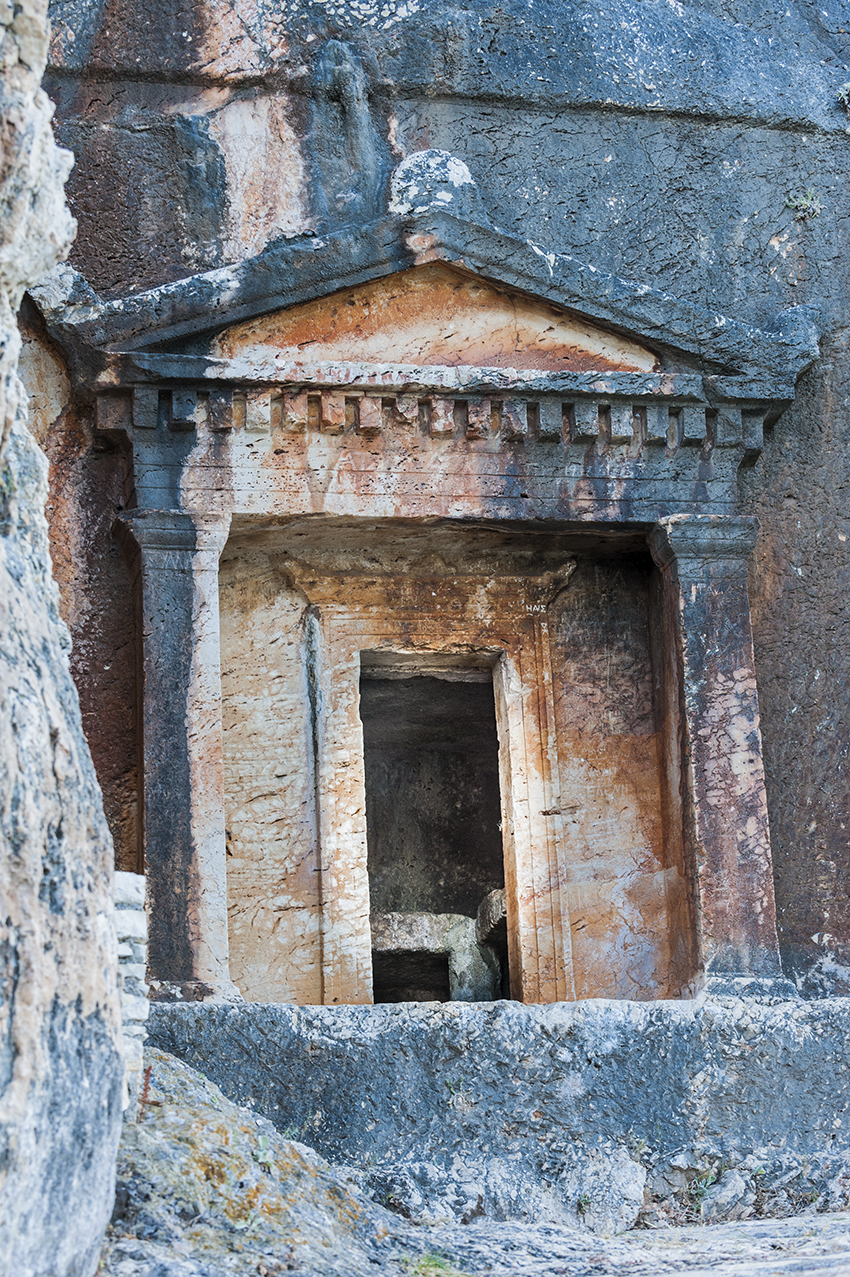
Lycian tomb in Kastellorizo, Greece

== See also ==
- Rock-cut tombs in ancient Israel
