= Nefesh (disambiguation) =

Nefesh is a Semitic monument placed near a grave so as to be seen from afar.

Nefesh or Nephesh may also refer to:

- Nephesh, a Hebrew word for soul
- Nefesh (group), a networking organization for Torah-observant mental health professionals
- Nefesh B'Nefesh, an organization that promotes Aliyah
