= Kidron Valley =

Valley originating in Jerusalem

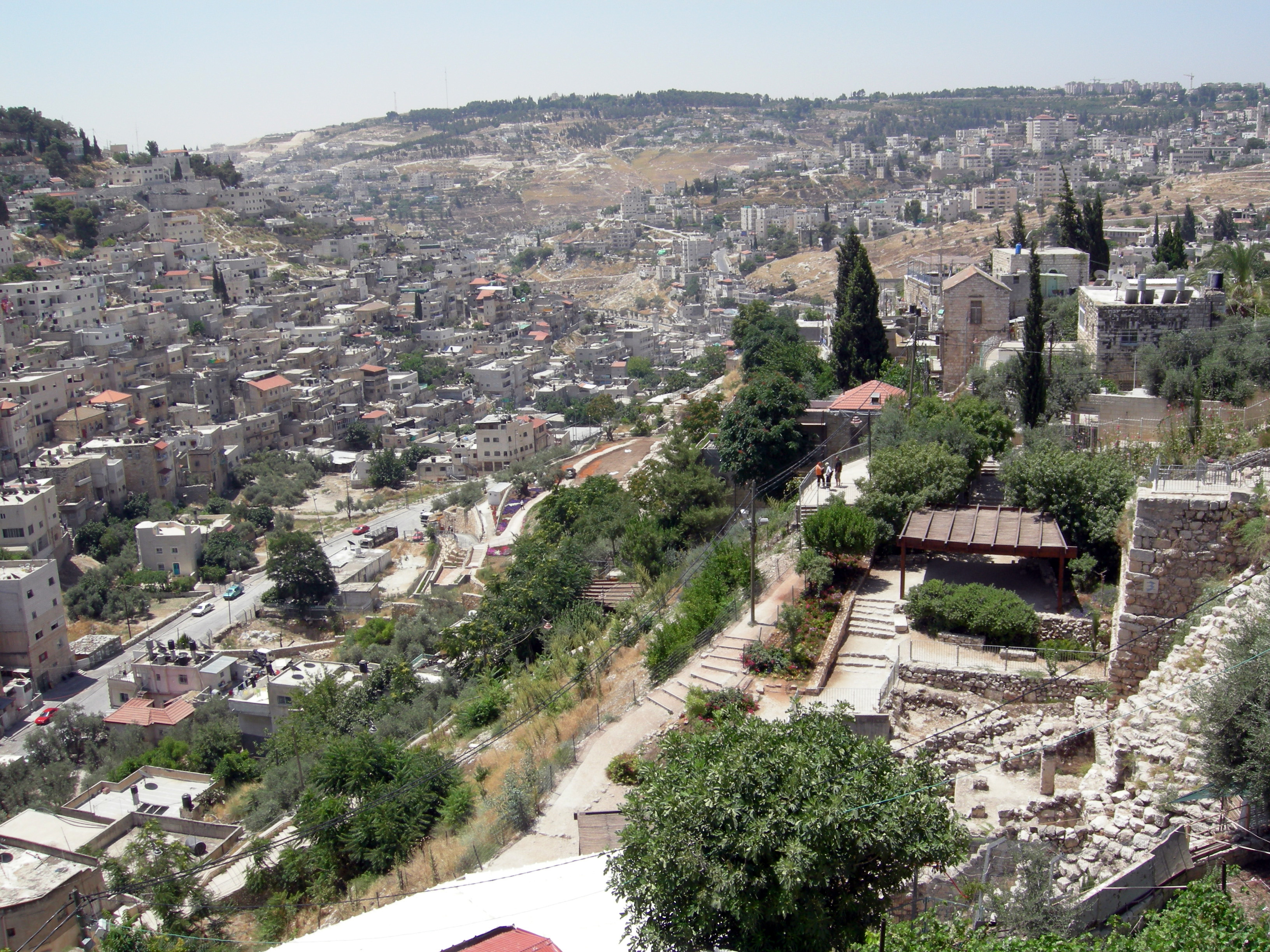
Kidron Valley viewed from the Old City of Jerusalem, with the Stepped Stone Structure (bottom right)

The Kidron Valley (classical transliteration, Cedron, from Hebrew: נחל קדרון, Naḥal Qidron, literally Qidron River; also Qidron Valley) is a valley originating slightly northeast of the Old City of Jerusalem, which then separates the Temple Mount from the Mount of Olives, and ending at the Dead Sea. Beyond Jerusalem it continues in a general south-easterly direction through the Judean Desert in the West Bank, reaching the Dead Sea near the settlement of Ovnat, and descending 4,000 feet (1,200 m) along its 20-mile (32 km) course.

== Etymology ==
The Hebrew name Qidron is derived from the verb qadar, "to be dark", and may be meant in this context as "dusky".

In Christian tradition the similarity between the Greek word for cedar, κέδρος (kédros), and the Greek name of the valley as used in the Septuagint, Κεδρών (Kedrṓn), has led to the Qidron Valley being wrongly called "Valley of the Cedars".

In ancient Hebrew sources, as well as in Arabic, different segments of the valley bear different names. Arabic names include وادي الجوز, Wadi el-Joz, 'Valley of the Walnut', but possibly a shortening of "Valley of Josaphat", for the upper segment, near the Temple Mount; and Wadi en-Nar, 'Fire Valley', for the rest of it – with at least the segment at the ancient Mar Saba ('Saint Sabbas') monastery also known in the 19th century as Wadi er-Rahib, 'Monk's Valley'.

In its upper part, the Palestinian neighbourhood of Wadi Joz bears the valley's Arabic name. The Israeli settlement of Kedar, in the West Bank, is named after the valley’s Hebrew name; the settlement is considered illegal under international law by most of the international community.

The Hebrew Bible apparently calls the upper course Emek Yehoshafat, the "Valley of Josaphat". It appears in Jewish eschatologic prophecies, which include the return of Elijah, followed by the arrival of the Messiah, and the War of Gog and Magog and Judgment Day.

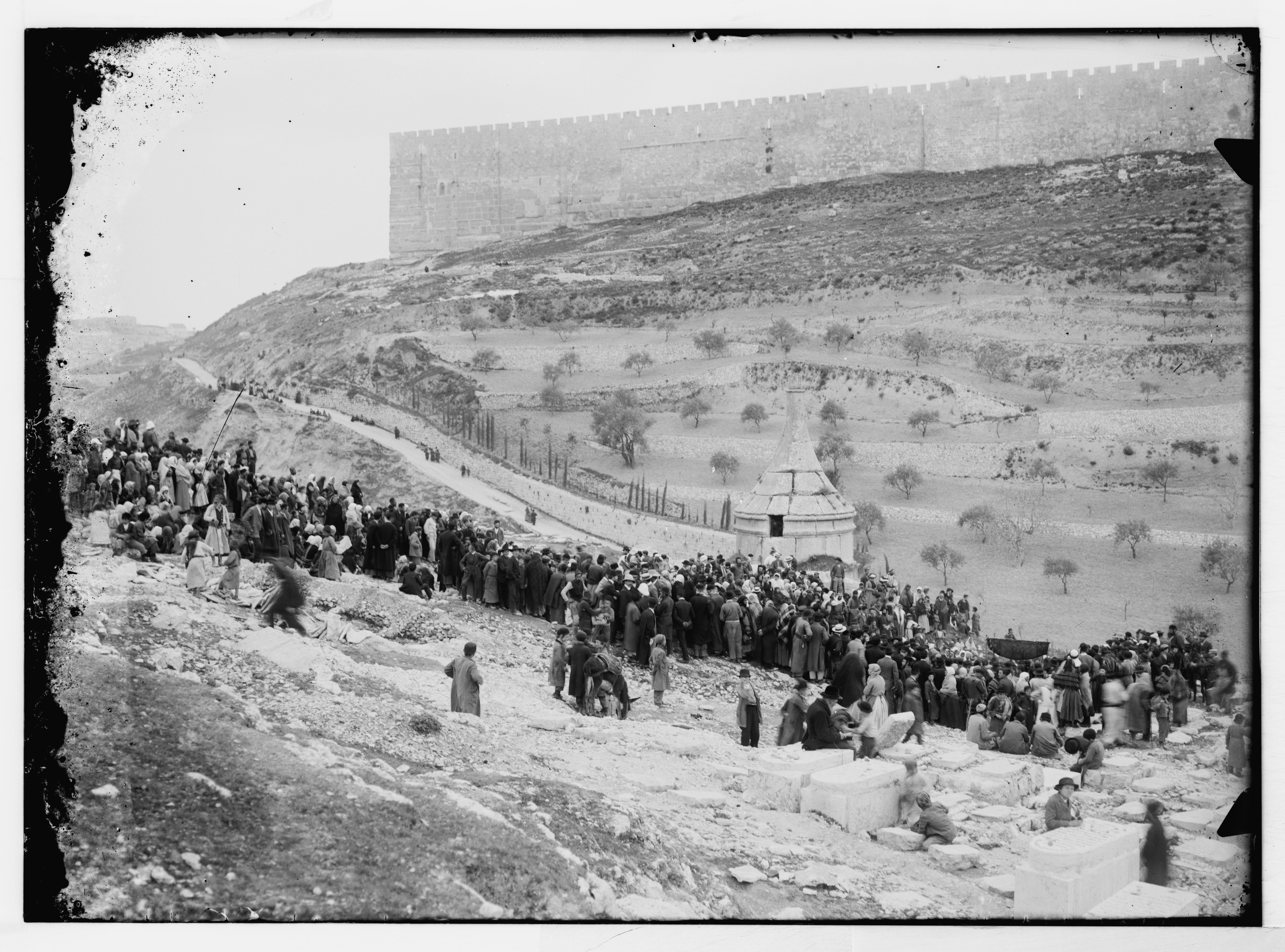
Dry plate photograph of Jews gathering at Absalom's Tomb in the Kidron Valley, early 20th century. View towards the south-west from the Jewish cemetery, with the south-eastern corner of Temple Mount in the upper background.

The upper Kidron Valley holds Jerusalem's most important cemetery from the First Temple period, the Silwan necropolis, assumed to have been used by the highest-ranking officials residing in the city, with rock-cut tombs dating between the 9th and 7th centuries BCE.

The upper Kidron Valley segment north of the Old City was one of the main burial grounds of Jerusalem in the Second Temple period, where hundreds of tombs have survived until today, while the segment east of, and opposite the Temple Mount, boasts several excellently preserved monumental tombs from the same period. Several of the Second Temple period tombs were also used later in time, either as burial or as shelters for hermits and monks of the large monastic communities which inhabited the Kidron Valley during the Byzantine Empire period (4th–7th century). The ancient tombs in this area attracted the attention of ancient travelers, most notably Benjamin of Tudela.

A source of confusion is the fact that the modern name "Kidron Valley" (Nahal Kidron in Hebrew) applies to the entire length of a long wadi, which starts north of the Old City of Jerusalem and ends at the Dead Sea, while the biblical names Nahal Kidron, Emek Yehoshafat, King’s Valley etc. might refer to certain parts of this valley located in the immediate vicinity of ancient Jerusalem, but not to the entire wadi, and certainly not to the long segment crossing the Judean desert. Similarly, in Arabic, large wadis have many names, each applied to a certain distinct segment of its course.

== Identification with biblical locations ==
=== Valley of Jehoshaphat ===
The Hebrew Bible talks of the "Valley of Jehoshaphat – Emek Yehoshafat" (Hebrew: עמק יהושפט), meaning "The valley where Yahweh shall judge." Not all scholars agree with the traditional view that the Kidron Valley, as the valley situated between Jerusalem and the Mount of Olives to the east, is the location of the Valley of Jehoshaphat. The Kidron Valley was not associated with the Valley of Jehoshaphat until the 4th century AD, making this identification somewhat uncertain since no actual valley of this name is known to pre-Christian antiquity.

Biblical commentator Adam Clarke claims that the Valley of Judgment is a symbolic place.

=== King's Garden and King's Valley ===
In the times of the Old Testament kings, the Kidron Valley was identified with, at least in part, the King's Garden; the kings owned land in the area. That the upper Kidron Valley was also known as the King's Valley, in which Absalom set up his monument or "pillar" (see 2 Samuel 18:18; no connection to the much later "Absalom's Pillar"), is problematic. The Bible does not make this identification explicit, and the association can only be inferred as associated with En-rogel, which is farther down the Kidron Valley towards the desert.

The name 'King's Valley' may be derived from its location just east of the palace of David in the City of David on the western slopes of the Kidron Valley and south of where the platform was built.

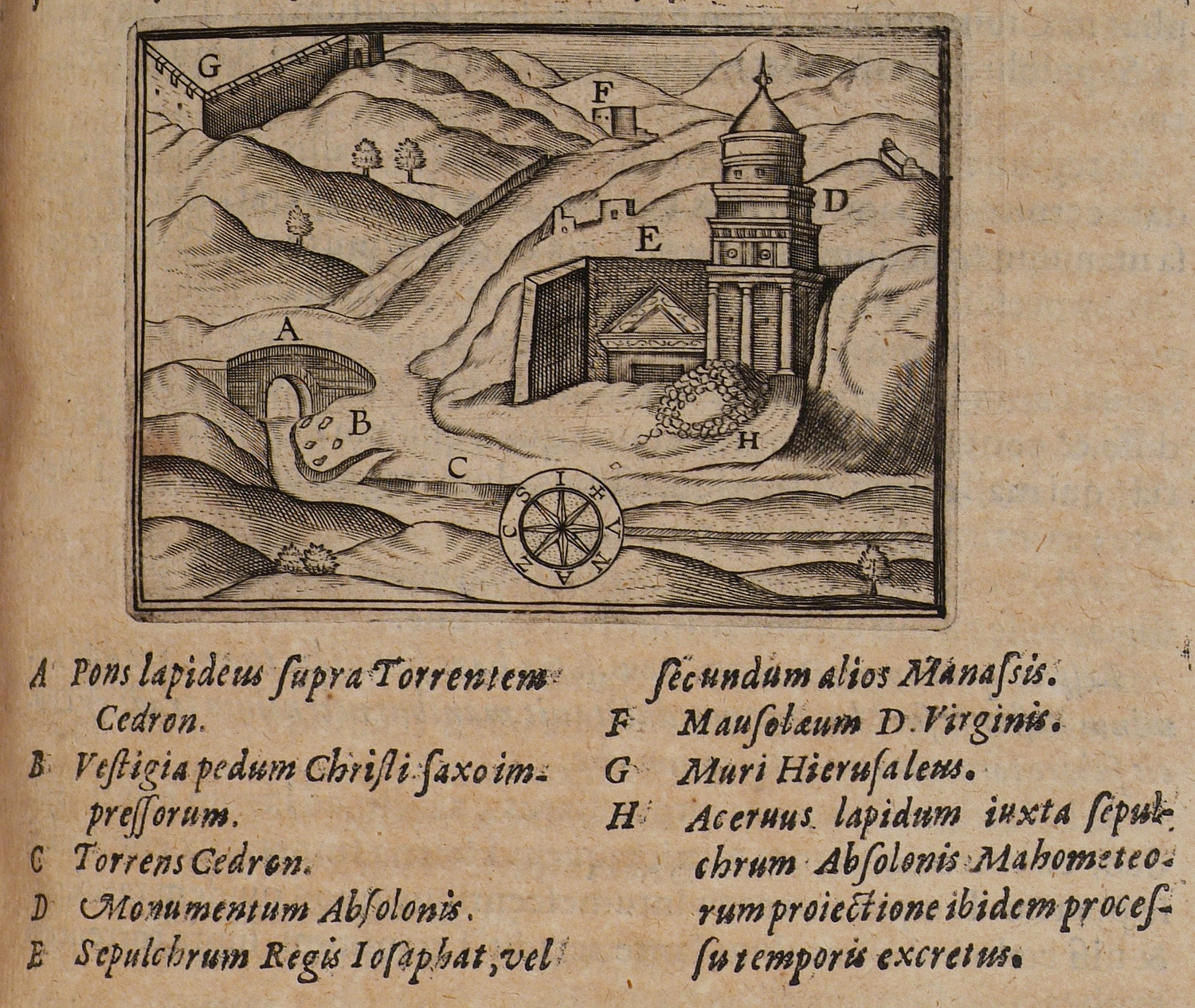
Jan van Cootwijk, folio from the Itinerary of Jerusalem and Syria: Kidron Valley with Jesus' footprints near the bridge, Absalom's pillar (right), and the Tomb of the Virgin in the background. Antwerp, 1619.

== Monumental tombs ==
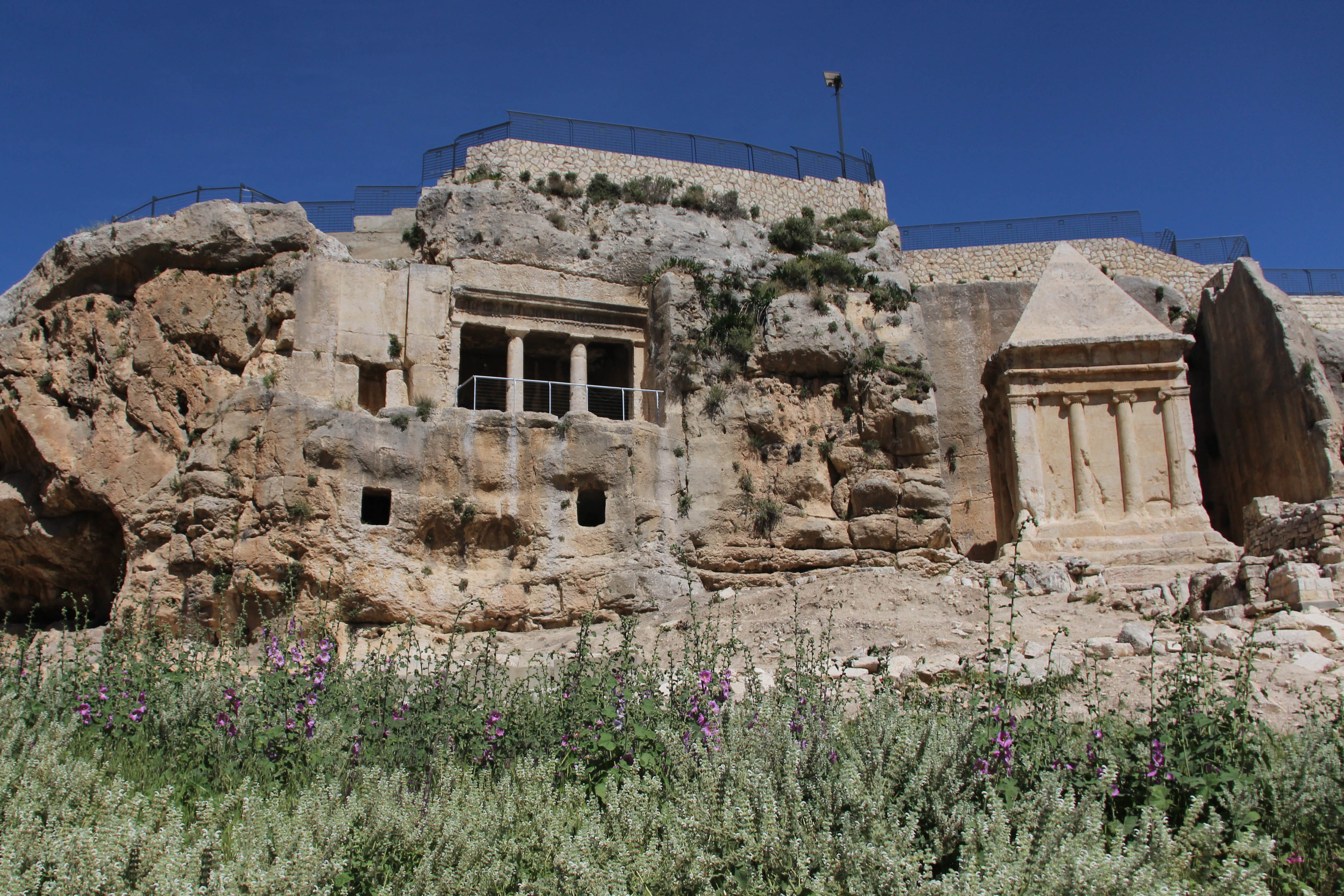
Benei Hazir Tomb (left) and Tomb of Zechariah (right)

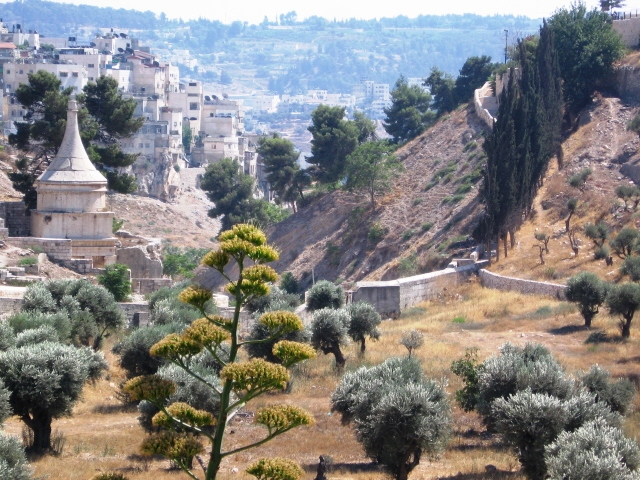
The so-called "Tomb of Absalom" or the pillar of Absalom in Kidron Valley

The three monumental tombs on the eastern side of the Kidron Valley are among the most well-known landmarks of ancient Jerusalem. These are, from north to south, the so-called "Tomb of Absalom" (Hebrew: Yad Avshalom), which rises in front of the so-called "Cave" or "Tomb of Jehoshaphat"; the (correctly named) Tomb of Benei Hezir (Benei Hezir is the Hebrew for "sons of Hezir", meaning the Hezir priestly family ); and the so-called "Tomb of Zechariah", which could quite likely be the nefesh of the Tomb of Benei Hezir.

Absalom's Tomb consists of two parts. First, a lower cube hewn out of the bedrock, decorated with engaged Ionic columns bearing a Doric frieze and crowned by an Egyptian cornice. This part of the monument contains a small chamber with an entrance and two arcosolia (arched funeral niches) and constitutes the actual tomb. The second part, built of ashlars, is placed on top of the rock-hewn cube. It consists of a square pedestal carrying a round drum, itself topped by a conical roof. The cone is slightly concave and is crowned by an Egyptian-style lotus flower. The upper part has the general shape of a tholos and is interpreted as a nefesh or monument for the tomb below, and possibly also for the adjacent "Cave of Jehoshaphat". The "Pillar of Absalom" is dated to the 1st century CE.

Literally, the word nefesh means 'soul', but in a funerary context it is the term applied to a form of funerary monument. In descriptions of the tombs of the Jewish nobility, the pyramid shape is also emphasized as the mark of a tomb. This would imply that nefesh and pyramid were synonymous. The Jewish tombs in the Kidron Valley are the best examples of this form of nefesh. They appear as a rectangular, pyramid-capped monument. Similar forms of the nefesh decorate ossuaries, with the addition of a dome-capped column. In Jerusalem the nefesh as a tomb monument stood either above or beside the tomb; set on steps or on a base.

== Bible ==
=== Hebrew Bible ===
King David fled through the Kidron Valley during the rebellion of Absalom (2 Samuel 15:23).

It was in this valley where King Jehoshaphat is thought to have overthrown the enemies of Israel (2 Chr. 20:26).

Chapters 29, 30 and 31 of 2 Chronicles (2 Chronicles 29–31) cover King Hezekiah's call for the sanctification of the ministers of the Lord, the purification of unclean things, an invitation to all Israel and Judah to celebrate Passover in Jerusalem, and liturgical reforms. As part of these changes, which took place around 700 BCE, "altars for offering incense they took away and threw into the Wadi Kidron" (2 Chronicles 30:14). During the same reforms and as part of the ritual cleaning of the Temple, the priests removed the unclean items from the inner part of the Temple to the courts, and the Levites carried the unclean items to Wadi Kidron (2 Chronicles 29:16).

==== Kidron Valley in Jewish eschatology ====
The Book of Joel mentions that God will assemble all nations in the "Valley of Jehoshaphat" (Joel 3:2, Joel 3:12).

=== Gospels ===
According to the New Testament, Jesus crossed the valley many times travelling between Jerusalem and Bethany. The valley contains the Garden of Gethsemane, where Jesus prayed the night before he was crucified. The name Kidron was mentioned in John 18:1.

== History ==
=== Middle Bronze Age ===
==== Middle Bronze IIB ====
A farmstead from the Kidron Valley was excavated.

=== Roman period ===
==== The Akeldama Tombs ====
The Akeldma Tombs were discovered in 1989 at the confluence of the Kidron and Hinnom Valleys, south of Jerusalem's Old City, and were excavated and published by archaeologists Gideon Avni and Zvi Greenhut. In 1989, the Jerusalem Municipality conducted routine development work in the area. Upon widening a narrow street near one of the approaches to the Silwan village, bulldozers uncovered a number of square openings hewn into rock. The Israel Antiquities Authority immediately stopped the road construction. After uncovering the underground spaces, archaeologists found themselves standing inside large burial complexes which appeared intact. Moving carefully from one chamber to another, flashlights revealed an abundance of artifacts scattered on the floors, pottery and glass vessels, oil lamps and many ornamental ossuaries. The three large caves proved to be part of an extensive Jewish burial ground in use at the end of the Second Temple period, which terminated in the year 70 AD, when Jerusalem was conquered and the Temple destroyed by the Roman legions.

== Modern times ==
=== Upper course ===
As of 2010, there is a controversial proposal to reconstruct part of the Kidron Valley, an Arab neighborhood of Silwan in East Jerusalem, and turn it into a park to be called the Garden of the King.

=== Lower course ===
A road crossing the very steep Wadi Naar (lower Kidron Valley) and connecting Arab towns has been substantially upgraded as part of the USAID effort to modernise the Arab infrastructure. An existing road has been widened and re-paved, and efforts were made to improve the route it takes.

=== Kidron stream restoration project ===
Currently, part of East Jerusalem's and the Palestinian Authority's sewage waters flow freely into the Kidron stream causing severe environmental damage in the Judean desert and the Dead sea area. In a rare collaboration with the Palestinian Authority, Hagihon is leading the Kidron stream restoration project with a budget of close to a billion shekels. According to the plan the sewage flow to the stream will be stopped and diverted to a new collection line, through an 8-km long pipe to the Og purification facility. To avoid damage to the natural valley as well as to the Marsaba Monastery and other archeological sites, the route of the sewage line was diverted from the stream itself, through a 60 meter deep 1.3 km long tunnel. The project also includes the construction of a hydroelectric station to generate green electricity. The purified water will be used for agriculture and irrigation of palm groves in the Jordan Valley and the Palestinian Authority.
