= Tomb of Zechariah =

Traditional tomb in Jerusalem

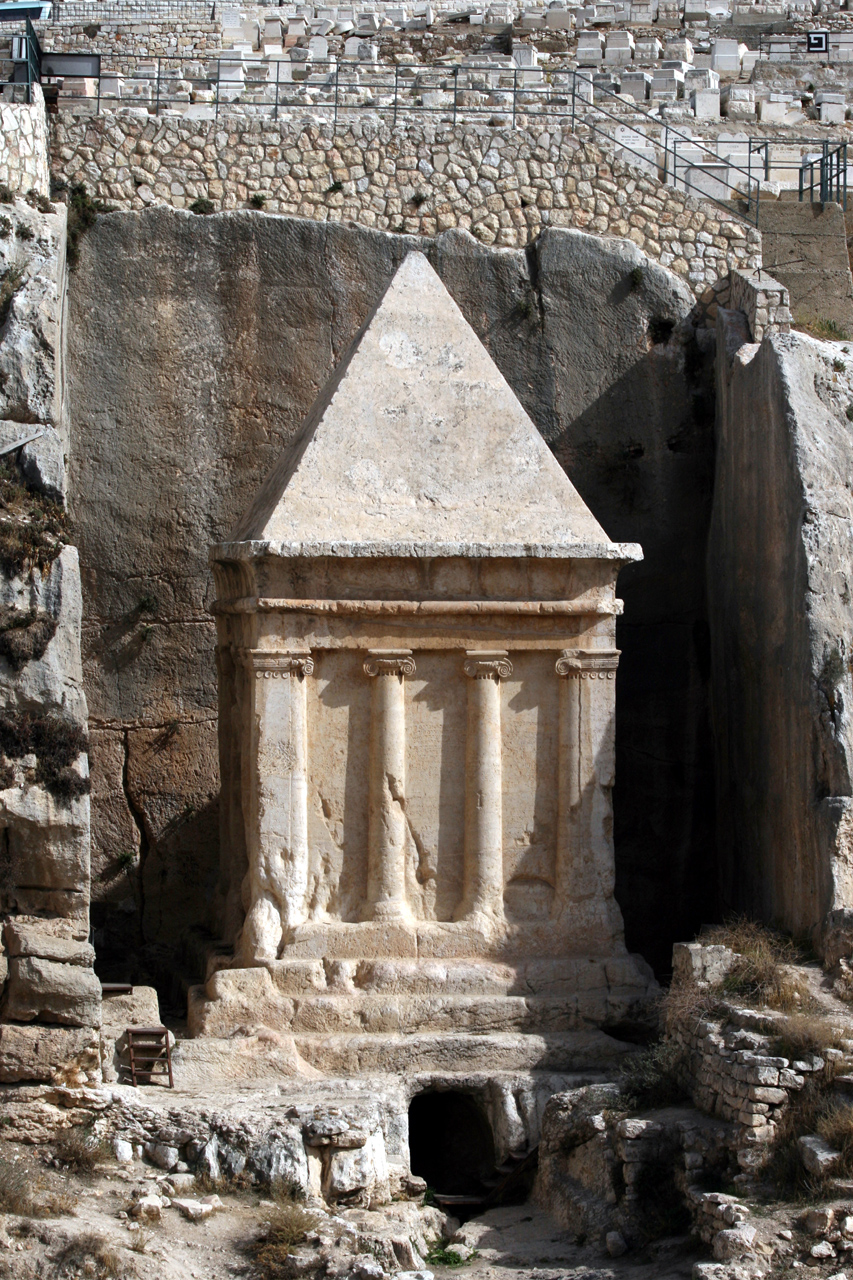
- Tomb of Zechariah (western facade)
- Interactive map of Tomb of Zechariah
- 31°46′34.45″N 35°14′20.83″E
- Type: Tomb
- Location: Kidron Valley, Jerusalem

History
- Built: 1st century AD

Site notes
- Material: Stone
- Public access: Yes

The Tomb of Zechariah is an ancient stone monument in Jerusalem that is considered in Jewish tradition to be the tomb of Zechariah ben Jehoiada. It is a few meters from the Tomb of Absalom and adjacent to the Tomb of Benei Hezir.

== Location ==
The tomb is cut into the limestone cliff face on the eastern escarpment of the Kidron Valley, directly across from the Temple Mount, some 6 metres (20 ft) southeast of the façade of the Tomb of Benei Hezir.

The cliff features several geological units: the harder, dense limestone of the Shivta Formation and the softer Nezer and Menuha formations above it. The Tomb of Zechariah, like the adjacent Tomb of Benei Hezir and the lower part of the Tomb of Absalom, is cut into the Shivta limestone; the overlying formations along the same slope support, by contrast, the burials of the modern Jewish cemetery on the Mount of Olives. Schmidt hammer rebound measurements on the Tomb of Zechariah, a method used to assess the hardness and strength of rock or concrete, yielded R-values between 58.9 and 64.4, consistent with "hard, dense, crystalline limestone".

== Architectural description ==
The monument is a monolith—it is completely carved out of the solid rock The lowest part of the monument is a crepidoma, a base made of three steps. Above it there is a stylobate, upon which there is a decoration of two ionic columns between two half ionic columns and at the corners there are two pilasters. The capitals are of the Ionic order and are decorated with the egg-and-dart decoration. The upper part of the monument is an Egyptian-style cornice upon which sits a pyramid. The fine masonry and decoration that is visible on the western side, the facade, is only the western side. On the other sides of the tomb, the work is extremely rough and unfinished; it seems as if the work was stopped before the artists could finish the job.

== Identification ==
=== Traditional identification ===
According to a Jewish tradition, which is first suggested by the 1215 AD writings of Menahem haHebroni, this is the tomb of the priest Zechariah Ben Jehoiada, a figure that the Book of Chronicles records to have been stoned:

And the Spirit of God came upon Zechariah the son of Jehoiada the priest, which stood above the people, and said unto them, Thus saith God, Why transgress ye the commandments of the Lord, that ye cannot prosper? because ye have forsaken the Lord, he hath also forsaken you. And they conspired against him, and stoned him with stones at the commandment of the king in the court of the house of the Lord

=== Scientific identification and dating ===
The style of the construction, which includes Hellenistic details such as Ionic columns, is similar to that of the Tomb of Benei Hezir, and several authors think that they are near-contemporary with one another; scholars specialising in funerary practices and monuments have ascribed a first-century CE date to the tomb. It has been proposed that the Tomb of Zechariah is actually the nefesh (a Jewish funerary monument similar to the Greek stele) for the Tomb of Benei Hezir, which is accessed from a rock-cut passage adjacent to the monument, and which states that it has an adjacent magnificent structure, an item not otherwise identified.

== Gallery ==
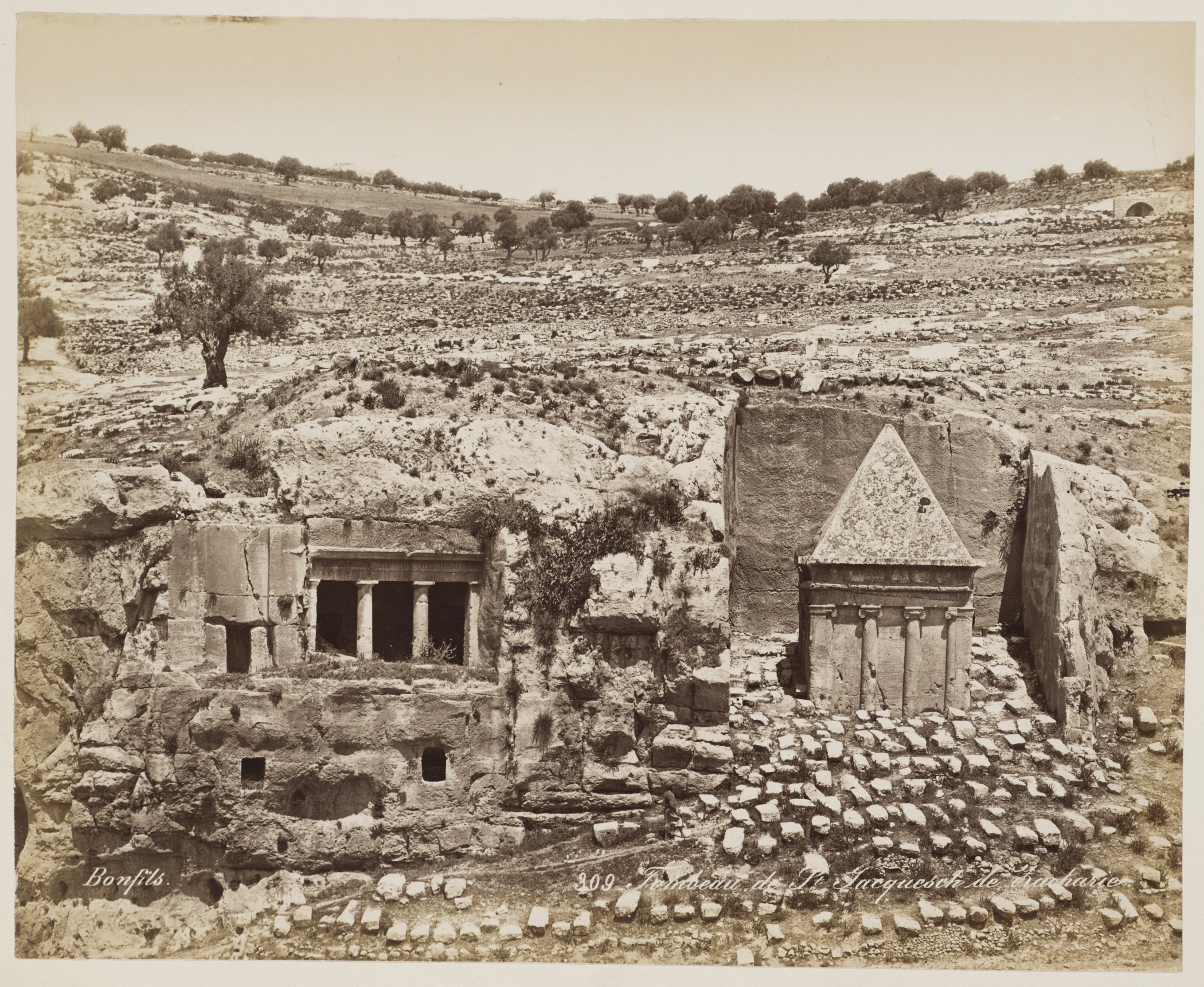
1870 photo by Felix Bonfils showing the Tomb of Zechariah to the right of the Tomb of Benei Hezir

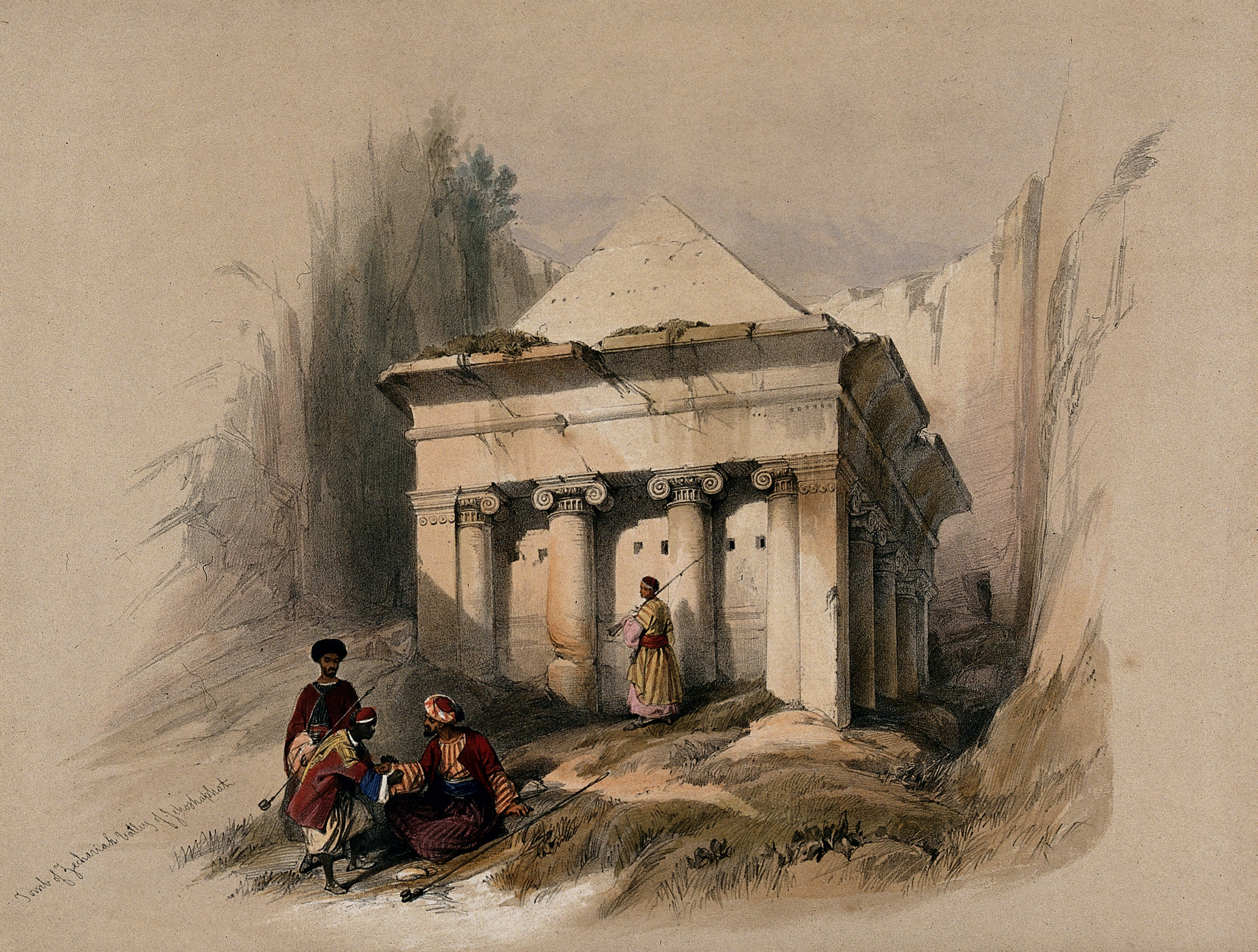
As depicted in David Roberts' The Holy Land, Syria, Idumea, Arabia, Egypt, and Nubia

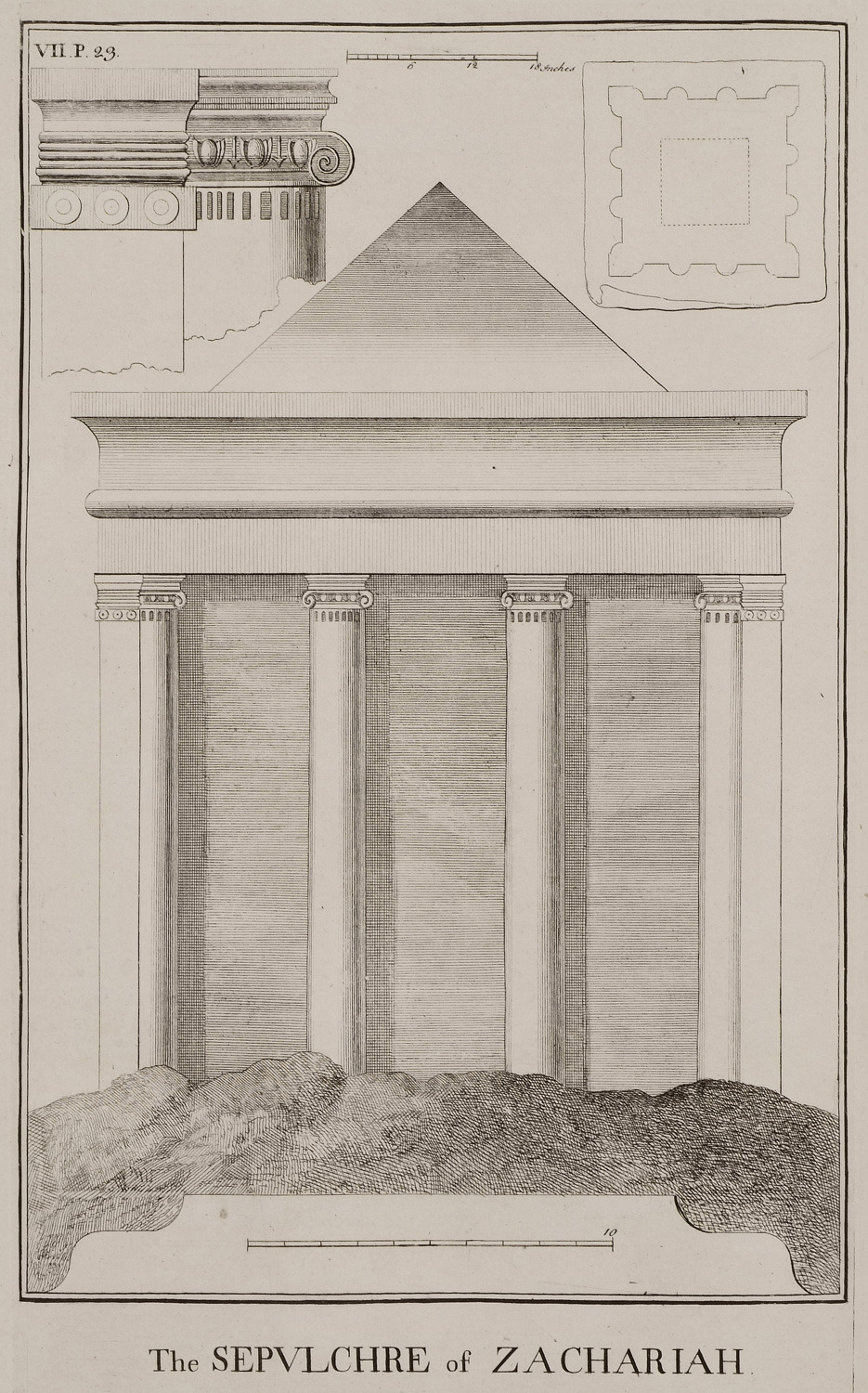
The Sepulchre of Zachariah - Pococke Richard - 1745

== See also ==
- Rock-cut tombs in ancient Israel

== Bibliography ==
- Barag, Dan (2003). "The 2000–2001 Exploration of the Tombs of Benei Hezir and Zechariah". Israel Exploration Journal. 53 (1): 78–110. JSTOR 27927026 – via JSTOR.
- Shtober-Zisu, Nurit; Zissu, Boaz (2018). "Lithology and the Distribution of Early Roman-era Tombs in Jerusalem's Necropolis". Progress in Physical Geography: Earth and Environment. 42 (5): 628–649. doi:10.1177/0309133318776484.
