= Tomb of Benei Hezir =

Tomb in Jerusalem

- קבר בני חזיר (Hebrew)
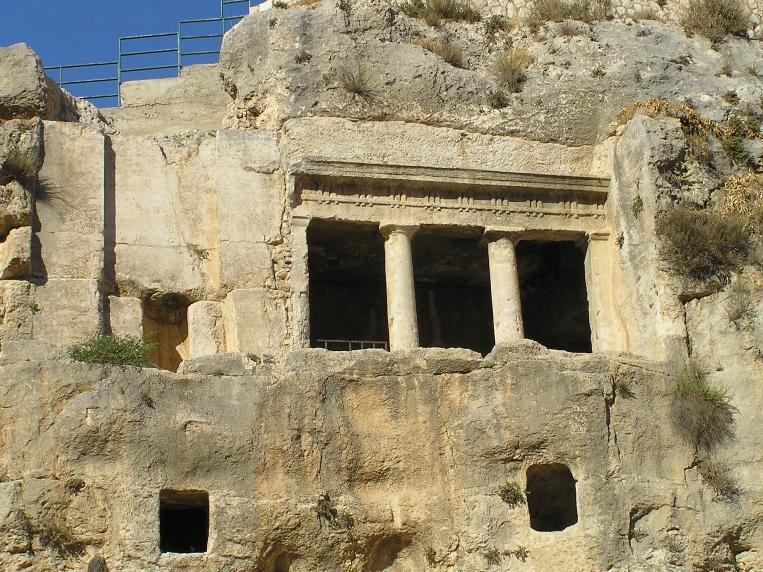
- Benei Hezir tomb (western facade)
- Interactive map of Tomb of Benei Hezir
- 31°46′35.21″N 35°14′20.87″E
- Type: Burial tomb
- Location: Kidron Valley, Jerusalem

History
- Built: 2nd century BCE

Site notes
- Condition: Partially preserved
- Owner: Public
- Management: Israel Antiquities Authority
- Public access: Yes

The Tomb of Benei Hezir (Hebrew: קבר בני חזיר), previously known as the Tomb of Saint James, is the oldest of four monumental rock-cut tombs that stand in the Kidron Valley in Jerusalem, adjacent to the Tomb of Zechariah and a few meters from the Tomb of Absalom. It dates to the Second Temple period. It is a complex of burial caves. The tomb was originally accessed from a single rock-cut stairwell which descends to the tomb from the north. At a later period an additional entrance was created by quarrying a tunnel from the courtyard of the monument known as "the Tomb of Zechariah". This is also the contemporary entrance to the burial complex.

== Location and geological setting ==
The tomb is hewn into a cliff face approximately 15 metres (49 ft) high on the eastern escarpment of the Kidron Valley, across from the Temple Mount. Its façade is elevated, with the floor lying about 6 metres (20 ft) above the base of the cliff.

The cliff features several geological units: the harder, dense limestone of the Shivta Formation and the softer Nezer and Menuha formations above it. The Tomb of Benei Hazir, like the adjacent Tomb of Zechariah and the lower part of the Tomb of Absalom, is cut into the Shivta limestone; the overlying formations along the same slope support, by contrast, the burials of the modern Jewish cemetery on the Mount of Olives.

== Architecture ==
The tomb's façade is a distylos in antis oriented roughly west-southwest. It incorporates two unfluted columns, each 3 metres (9.8 ft) high, surmounted by Doric capitals 0.18 metres (0.59 ft) high. The columns taper from a base diameter of 0.53–0.55 metres (1.7–1.8 ft) to 0.48 metres (1.6 ft) at the top. The flanking antae, terminate in Doric semi-capitals, the southern of which was left unfinished.

Above the columns is an entablature 0.95 metres (3.1 ft) high, comprising an architrave inscribed with a Hebrew funerary inscription, a Doric frieze of nine metopes, eight triglyphs, two half-triglyphs, and a cornice. The frieze is one of the key elements used in establishing the typology of tomb architecture in late Second Temple-period Judea. Its metopes are left blank, a feature that distinguishes pre-Herodian Doric friezes in the region from those of the Herodian and later periods, which typically include carved metope decoration. The frieze of the Benei Hezir tomb can be situated within a regional series of Hellenistic-period Doric friezes from Maresha, Samaria, Tel Ya'oz, and the Hasmonean Winter Palace at Jericho, all of which exhibit local variations on the same architectural scheme. Both the Doric façade and the adjoining nefesh façade were finished with fine smoothing using a toothed hammer.

== Inscription ==
A three-line inscription in Hebrew, 109 cm long and 19 cm high, is carved in the center of the architrave above the Doric facade, using the square script. Faint traces of red paint survive within the letters. The text reads:

זה הקבר והנפש שלאלעזר חניה יועזר יהודה שמעון יוחנן בני יוסף בן עובד יוסף ואלעזר בני חניה כהנים מבני חזיר This is the grave and the Nefesh (burial monument) of Eliezer Hania Yoazar Yehuda Shimon Yochanan Benei (sons of) Yosef Ben (son of) Oved Yosef and Elazar Benei (sons of) Hania, Kohanim of the Hezir family.

The standard translation, following the reading of archaeologist Nahman Avigad, identifies the tomb as that of six brothers, El'azar, Hanyah, Yo'ezer, Yehudah, Shim'on, and Yohanan, sons of Yosef son of 'Oved, together with two further brothers, Yosef and El'azar, sons of Hanyah, all designated priests of the sons of Hezir. Four generations of one family are thus named.

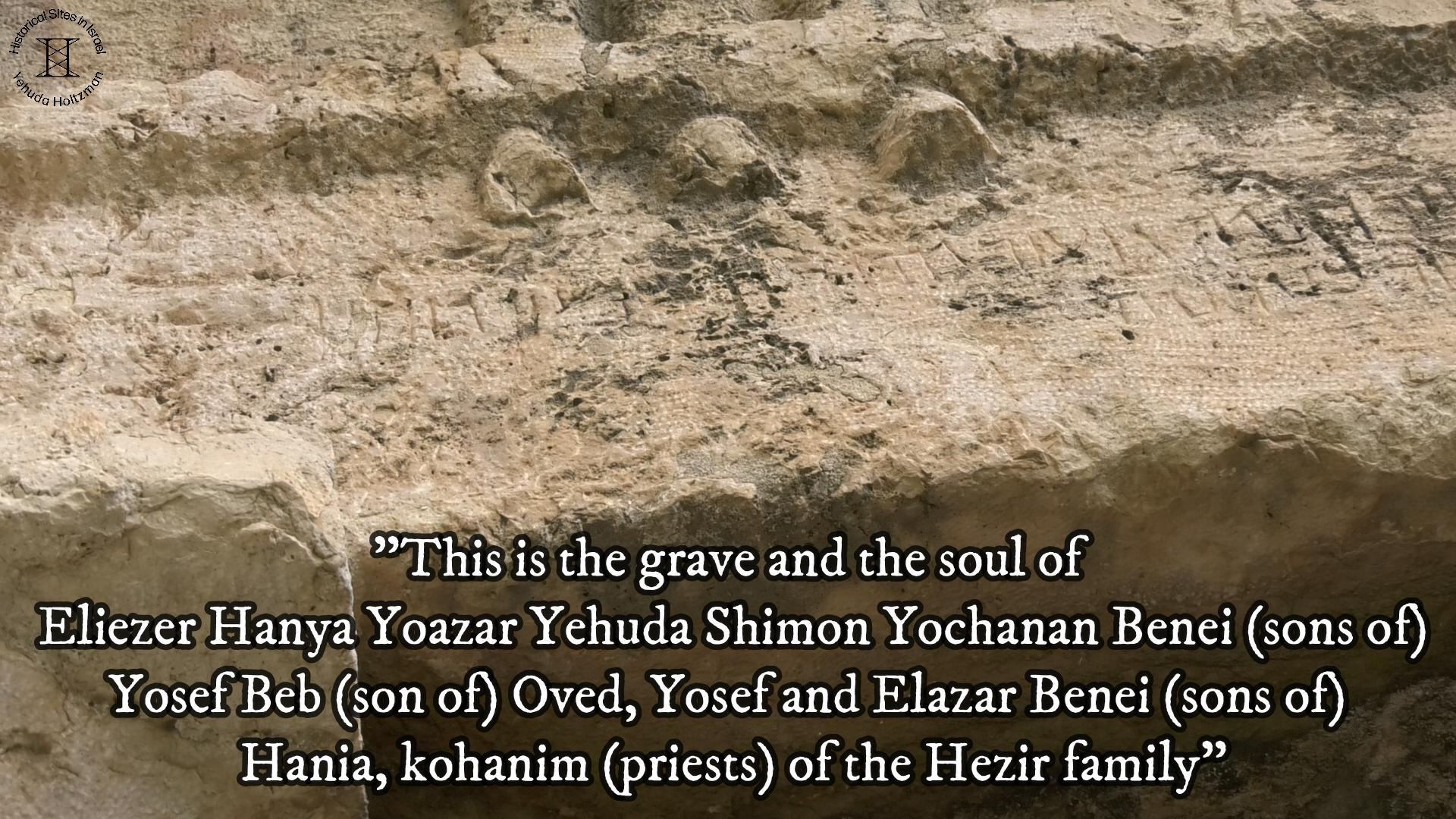
The inscription listing who are buried here

A worn secondary inscription in what appears to be Paleo-Hebrew script, identified by archaeologist Nahum Slouschz in 1924 on the closing slab of one of the tomb's burial niches (kokhim), has been tentatively read as referencing an Ovadiah son of G[...] and possibly the Hezir clan, though much of the text remains illegible.

== History ==
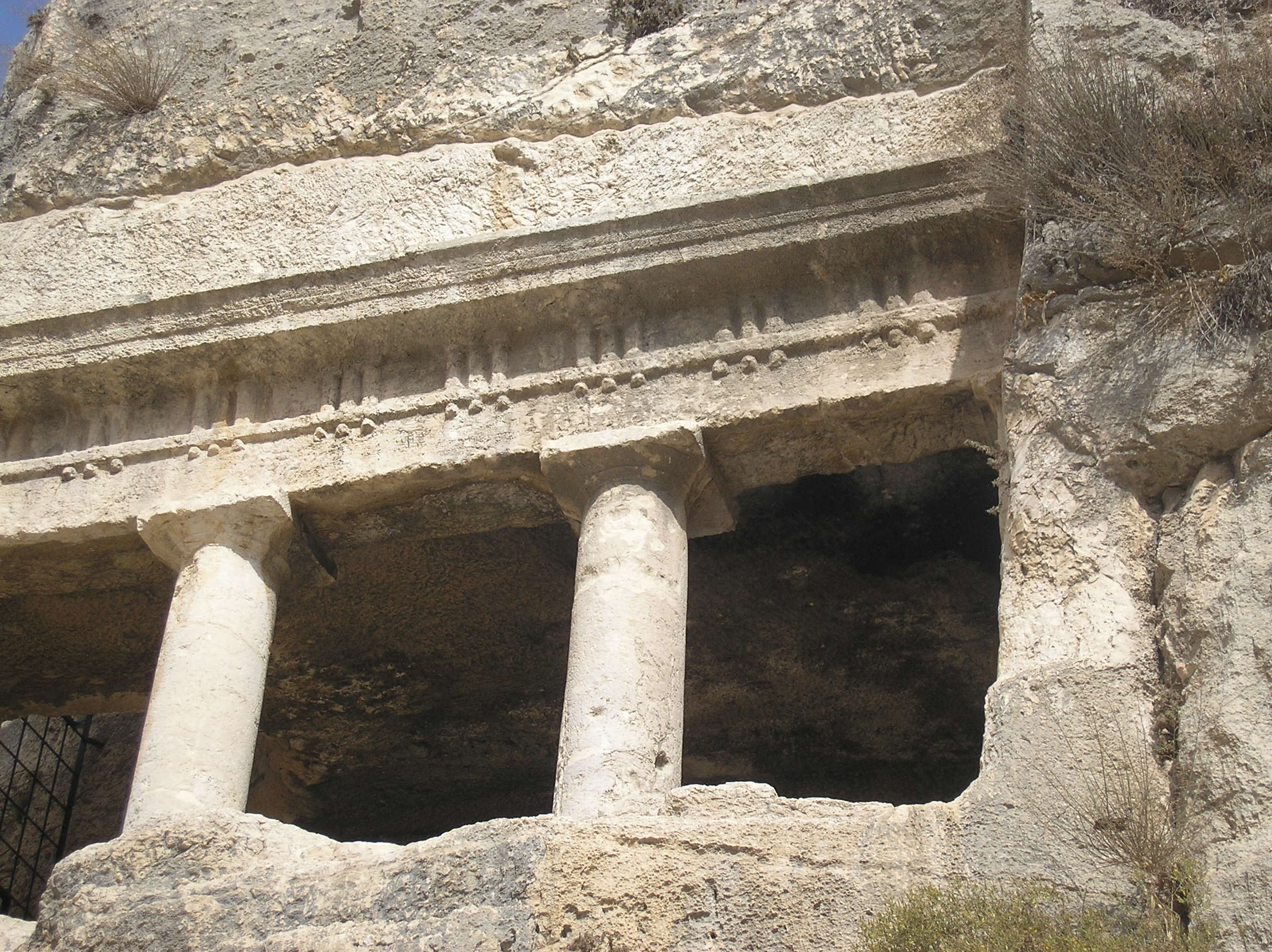
Detail of the surviving (southern) half of the loggia

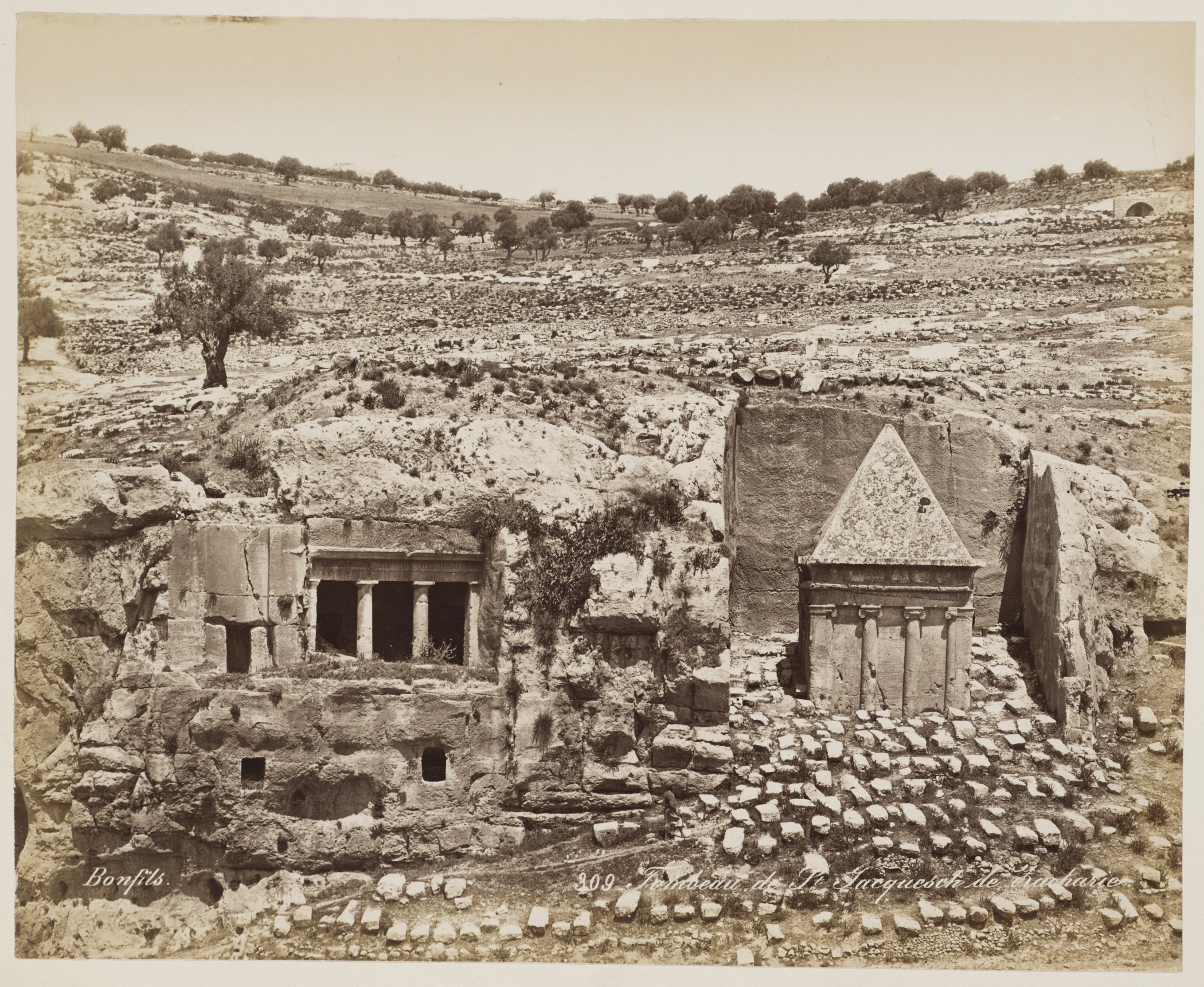
1870 photo by Felix Bonfils showing the Tomb of Benei Hezir to the left of the Tomb of Zechariah.

The tomb dates to the second century BCE, the Hellenistic period and the time of the Hasmonean monarchy in Jewish history. Architecturally the so-called Tomb of Zechariah postdates the complex, and the Tomb of Absalom is considered to have been erected even later. The tomb is effectively a burial cave dug into the cliff. It contains a Hebrew inscription, which makes it clear that this was the burial site of a priestly family called Benei Hezir, lit. "sons [descendants] of Hezir". The inscription reads:

== Name ==
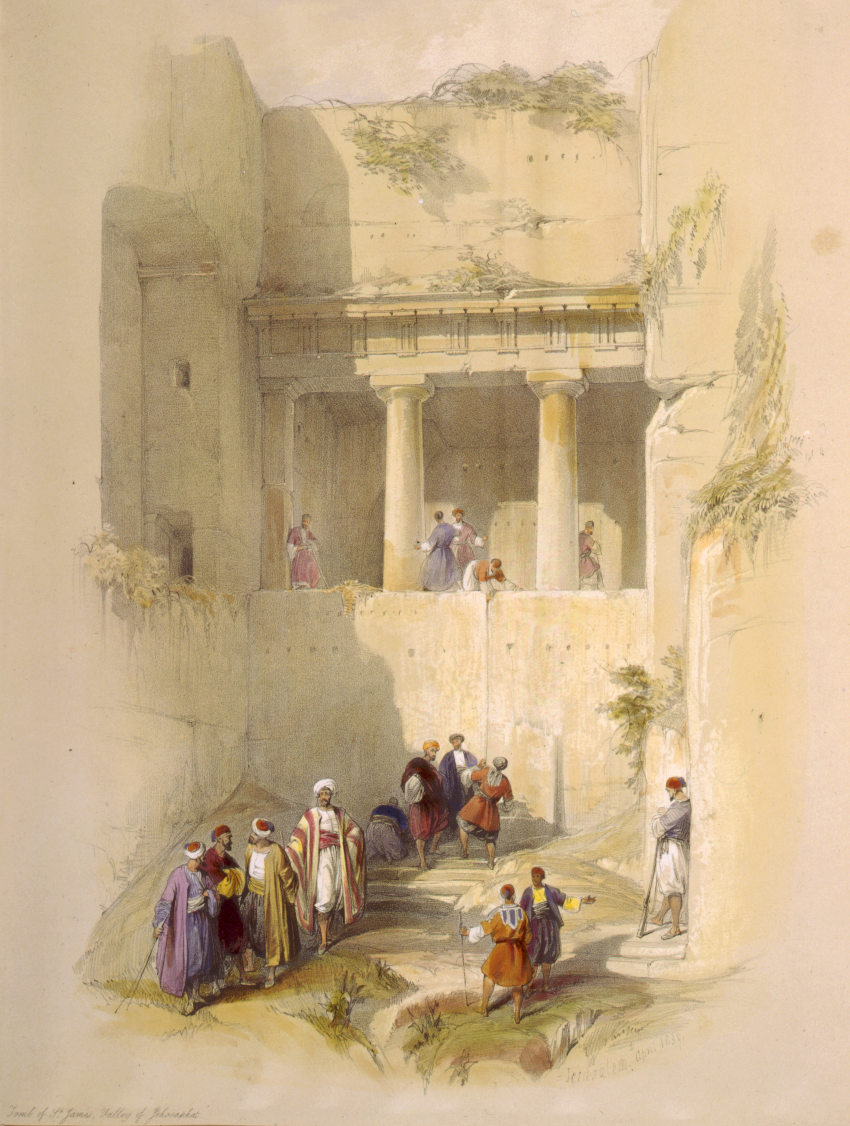
In David Roberts' The Holy Land, Syria, Idumea, Arabia, Egypt, and Nubia, it was titled the "Tomb of St. James"

The name Hezir appears twice in the Bible (see below). The inscription on the monument mentions the "sons of Hezir", meaning: the descendants of Hezir. The Hebrew term is bnei Hezir, usually written in English as Benei Hazir. The common misspelling Hazir is clearly wrong, since that means pig in Hebrew.

In the 19th century Westerners still identified the monument with the tomb of St. James the Apostle.

== Benei Hezir family ==
The tomb's inscription reveals that the cave was used by several generations of the Benei Hezir family. As well, it indicates that this was a wealthy family, able to afford a burial cave in the Kidron Valley. In the Hebrew Bible there are two mentions of men with the name of Hezir. One was the founder of the 17th priestly division (1 Chron. 24:15); the other one was among the leaders who set their seal to the covenant with Nehemiah (Neh. 10:20). It is not known if there is a relation between the family buried here and the biblical Hezirs.

== Nefesh ==
The inscription mentions a nefesh (נפש : literally meaning soul), which is also a designation for a magnificent structure built on or alongside the tomb. It has been proposed that the Tomb of Zechariah, a solid rock-hewn object which stands by the entrance, and is thought to date from a similar period to the inscription, is actually this nefesh. Another option is that the additional facade to the north of the Doric dystilos-in-antis was the original nefesh. Although it did not survive, it is possible to reconstruct the upper part of the above-mentioned facade as a Nabataean tower with a decorative door and window; similar monuments can be seen in Petra.

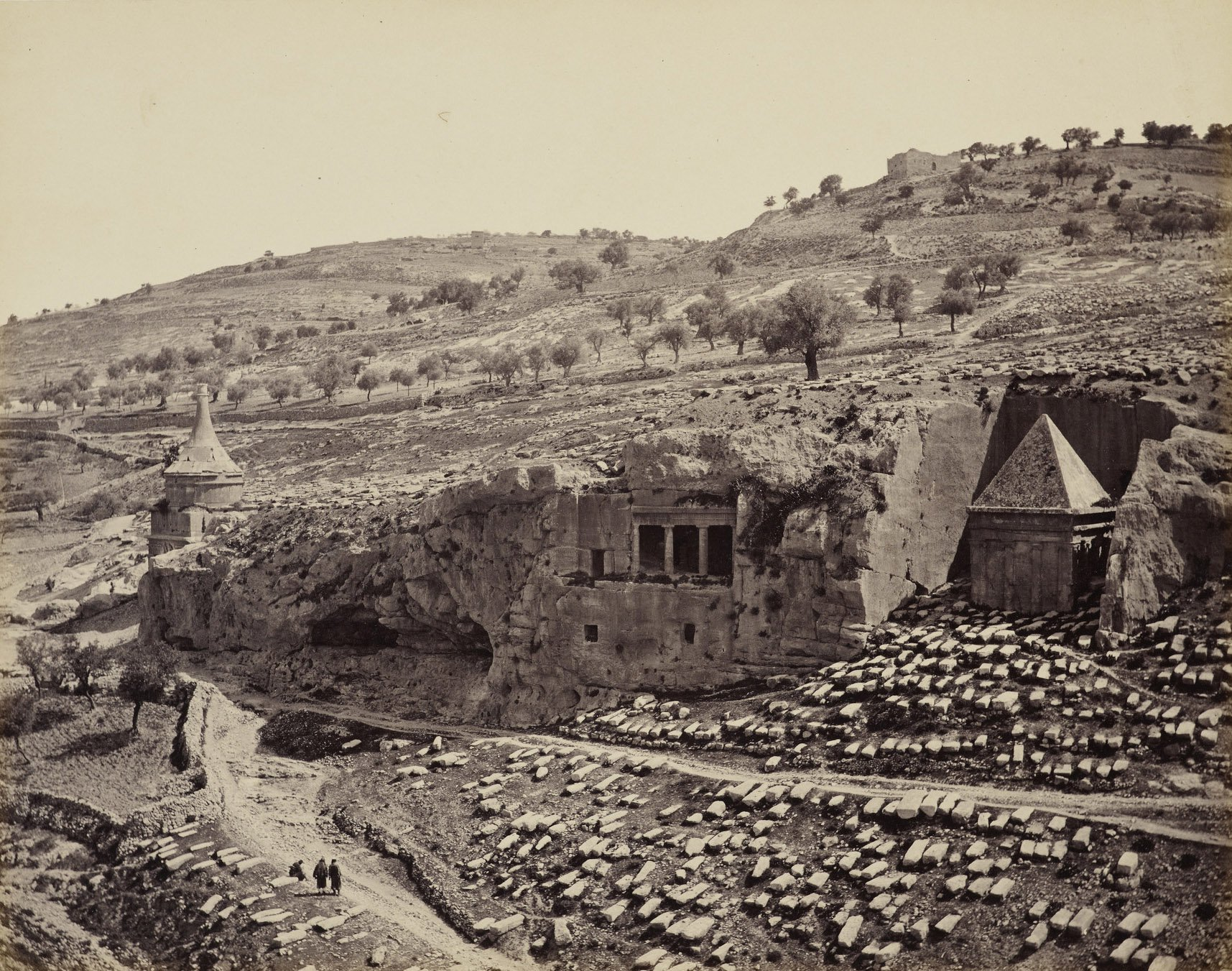
1862 CE

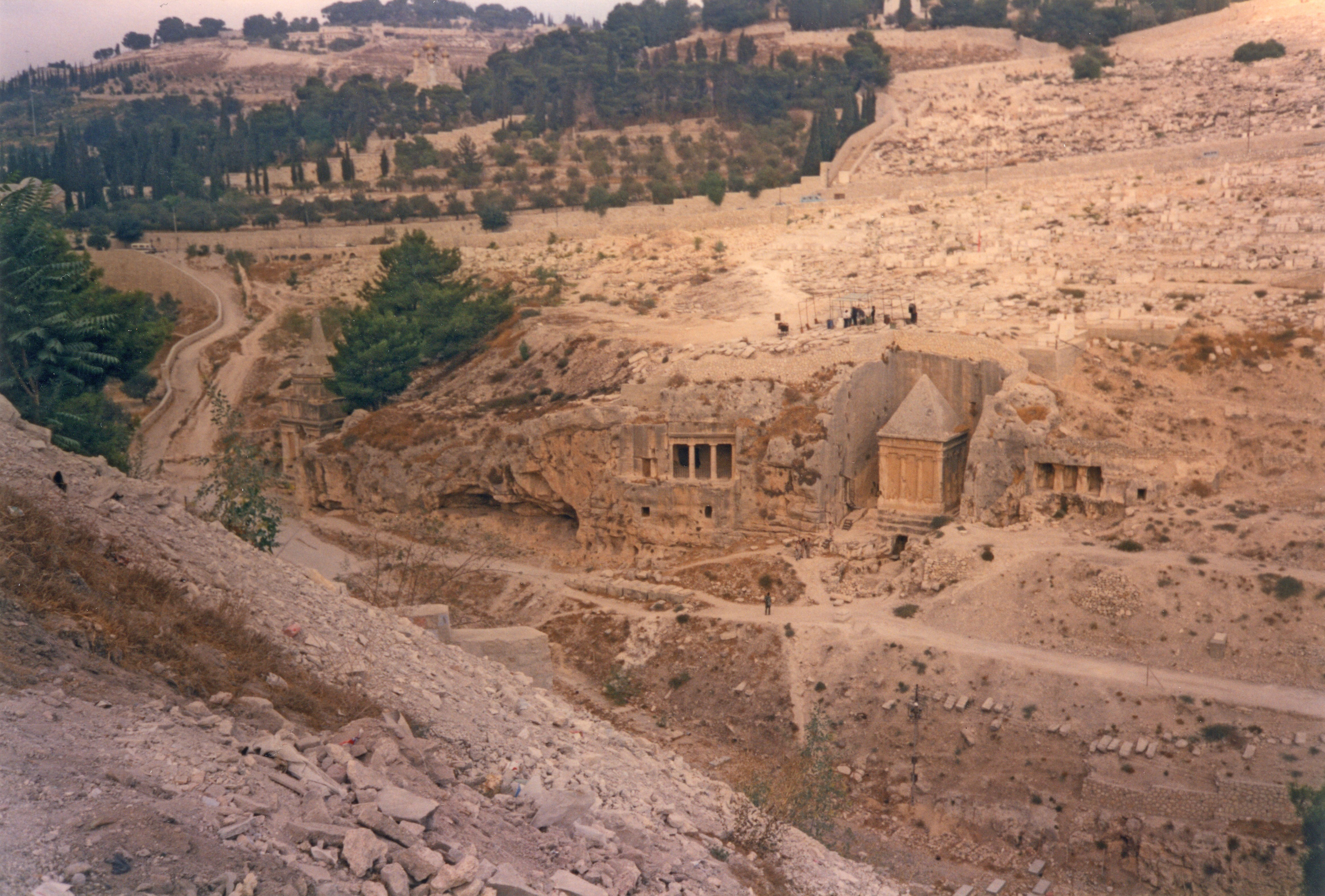
1988 CE

Two panoramas, 126 years apart, from right to left Tomb of Zechariah, the Tomb of Benei Hezir and Tomb of Absalom.

== See also ==
- Rock-cut tombs in ancient Israel
- Mokata 'Abud
- Khirbet Kurkush
- Deir ed-Darb
- Jason's Tomb
- Tomb of Absalom

== Bibliography ==
- Barag, Dan (2003). "The 2000–2001 Exploration of the Tombs of Benei Hezir and Zechariah". Israel Exploration Journal. 53 (1): 78–110. JSTOR 27927026 – via JSTOR.
- Fischer, Moshe; Tal, Oren (2003). "Architectural Decoration in Ancient Israel in Hellenistic Times: Some Aspects of Hellenization". Zeitschrift des Deutschen Palästina-Vereins. 119 (1): 19–37. JSTOR 27931710 – via JSTOR.
- Hachlili, Rachel (2005). Jewish Funerary Customs, Practices and Rites in the Second Temple Period. Supplements to the Journal for the Study of Judaism. Vol. 94. Leiden: Brill. ISBN 978-90-04-12373-1.
- Peleg-Barkat, Orit (2012). "The Relative Chronology of Tomb Façades in Early Roman Jerusalem and Power Displays by the Élite". Journal of Roman Archaeology. 25 (1): 403–418. doi:10.1017/S1047759400001276.
- Shtober-Zisu, Nurit; Zissu, Boaz (2018). "Lithology and the Distribution of Early Roman-era Tombs in Jerusalem's Necropolis". Progress in Physical Geography: Earth and Environment. 42 (5): 628–649. doi:10.1177/0309133318776484.
- Zissu, Boaz; Abadi, Omri (2024). "Pilgrimage Pathways: Burial Monuments and Road Networks in Early Roman Jerusalem". Cercetări Arheologice. 31 (2): 347–378. doi:10.46535/ca.31.2.05.
