= Tomb of Absalom =

Ancient monumental rock-cut tomb in Jerusalem

- יד אבשלום
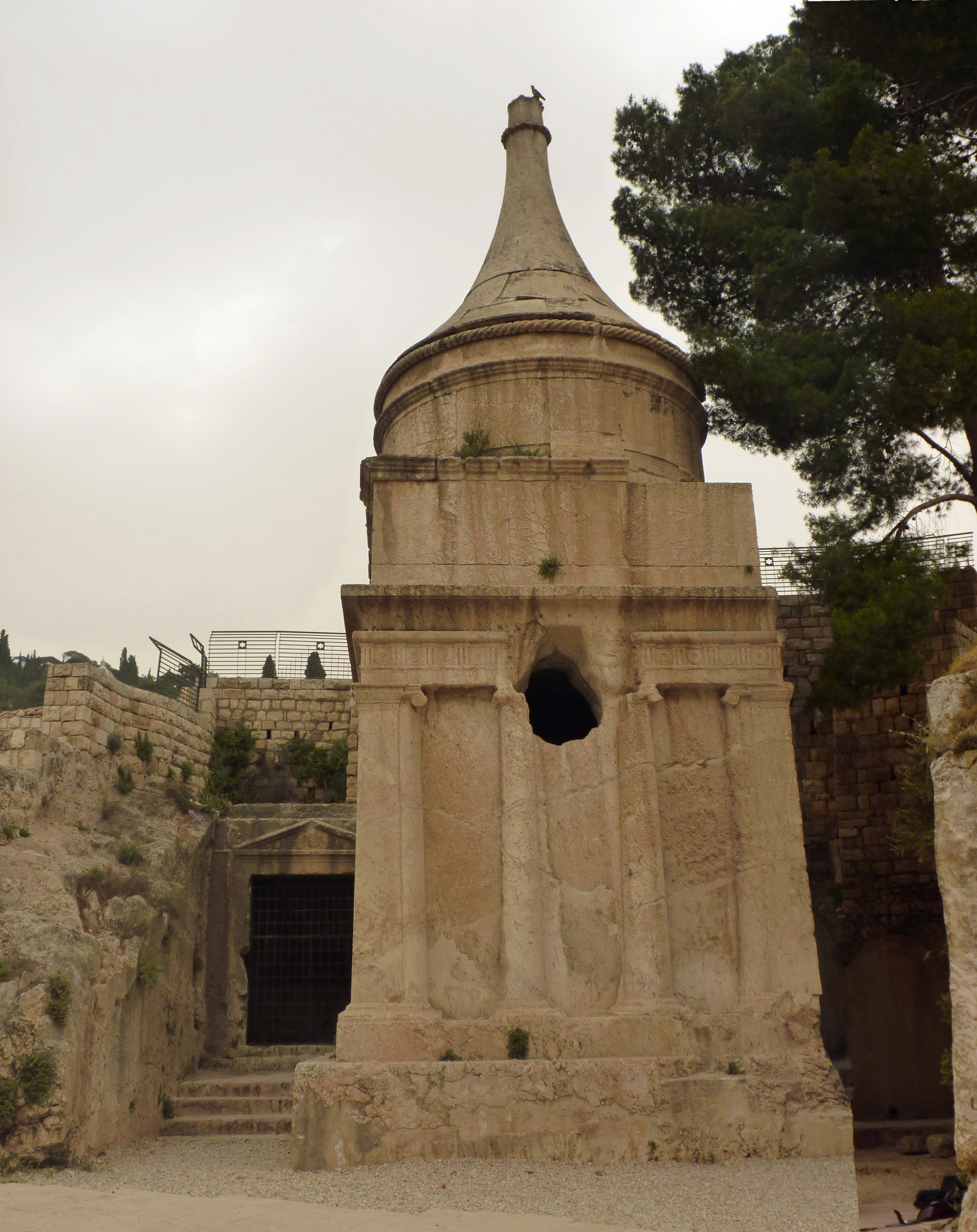
- Western facade of the Tomb of Absalom
- Interactive map of Tomb of Absalom
- Location: Kidron Valley, Jerusalem
- Coordinates: 31°46′37.05″N 35°14′20.25″E
- Type: Monumental rock-cut tomb
- Material: Monolithic limestone (lower) and ashlar (upper)
- Height: 20 metres (66 ft)
- Completion date: 1st century AD
- Dedicated to: Traditionally Absalom

The Tomb of Absalom (Hebrew: יד אבשלום, romanized: Yad Avshalom, lit. 'Absalom's Memorial'), also called Absalom's Pillar, is an ancient monumental rock-cut tomb with a conical roof located in the Kidron Valley in Jerusalem, a few metres from the Tomb of Zechariah and the Tomb of Benei Hezir. Although traditionally ascribed to Absalom, the rebellious son of King David of Israel (c. 1000 BC), recent scholarship has dated it to the 1st century AD.

The tomb is not only a burial structure in its own right, with its upper part serving as a nefesh (funeral monument) for the tomb in its lower part, but it was probably also meant as a nefesh for the adjacent burial cave system known as the Cave or Tomb of Jehoshaphat, with which it forms one entity, built at the same time and following a single plan.

The freestanding monument contains a burial chamber with three burial sites. The chamber is carved out of the solid lower section of the monument, but can only be accessed from the upper section via a built entrance and a staircase. It has been compared to Petra, given the rock-cut nature of the bottom segment and the style of the finial.

== Description ==
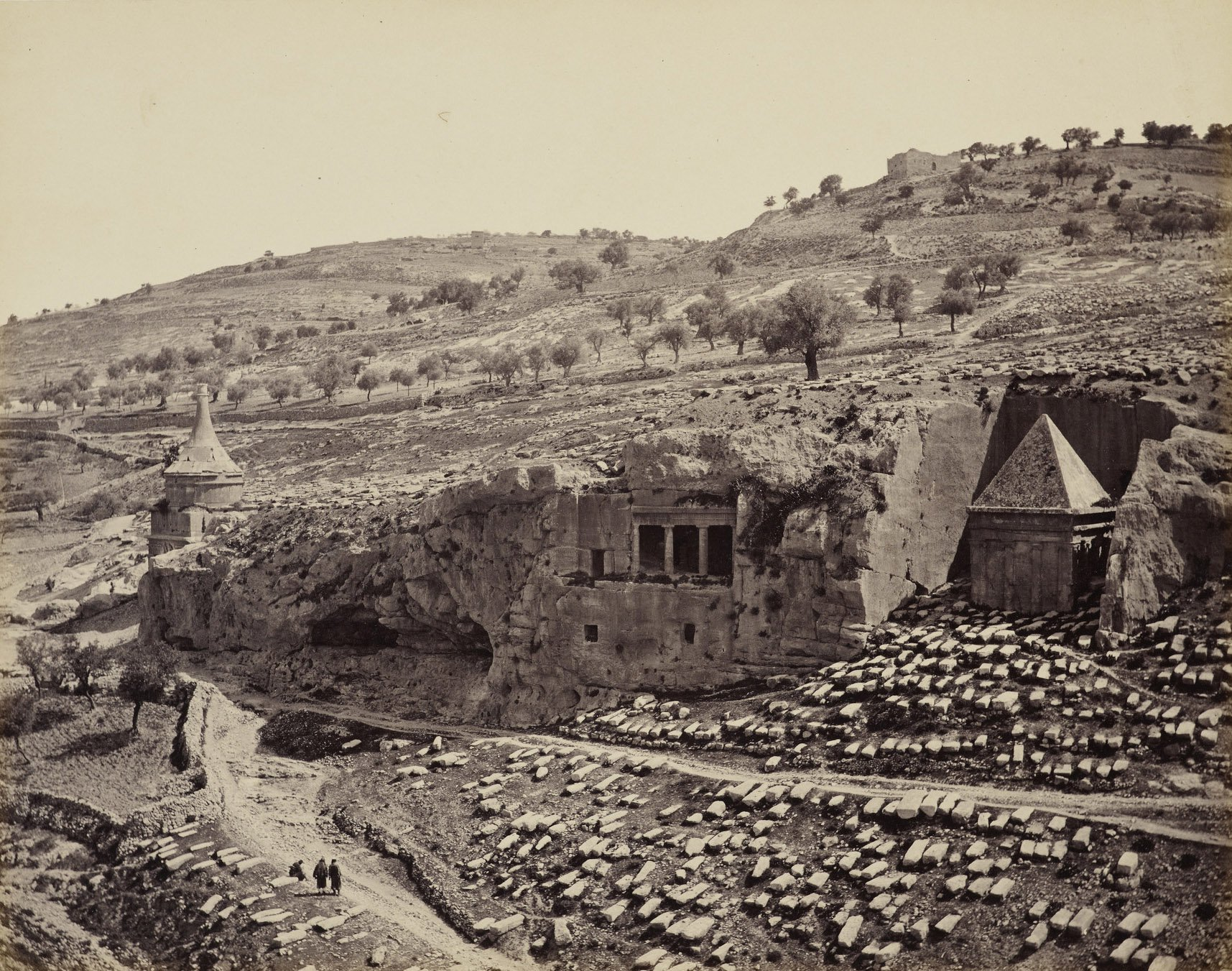
1862

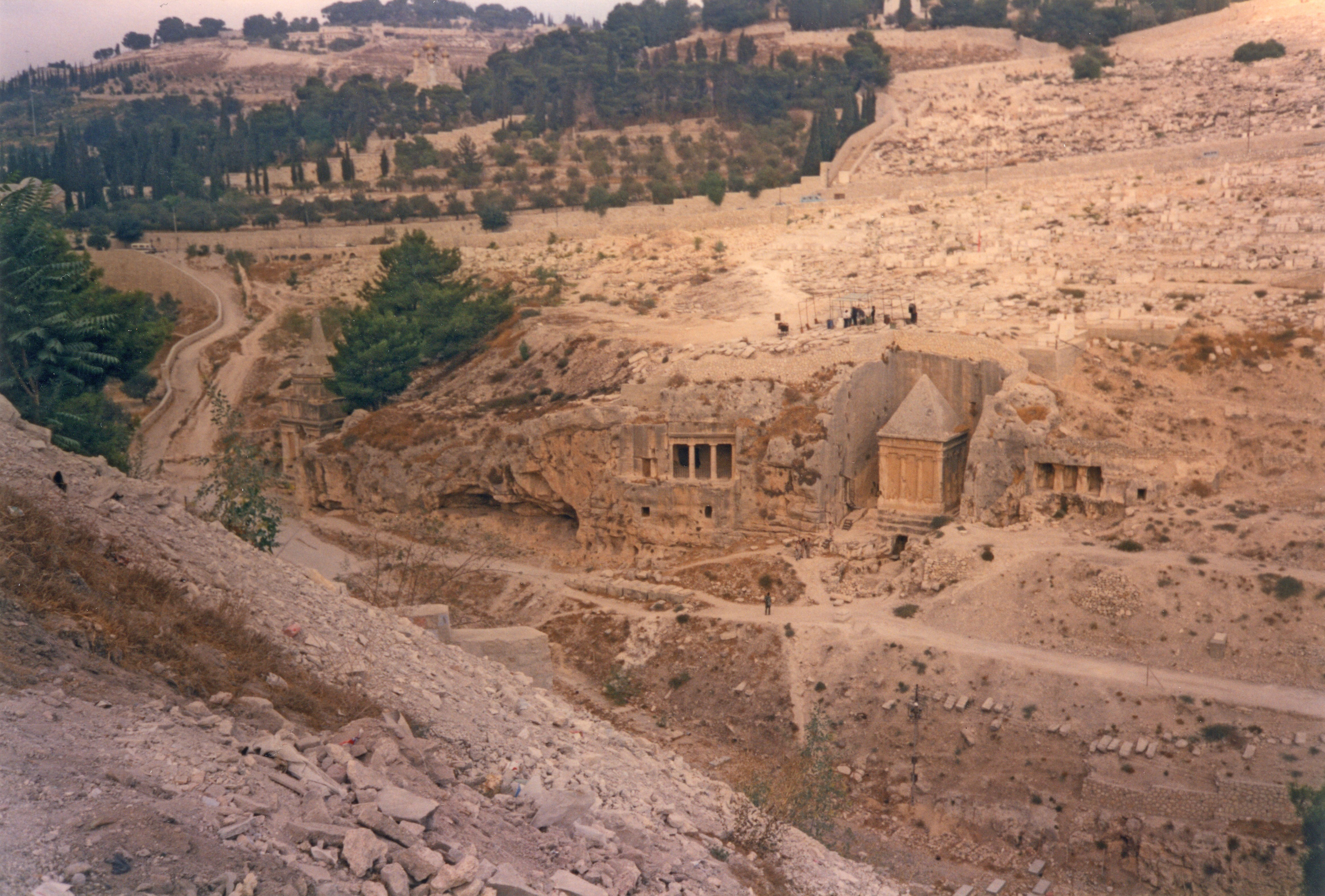
1988

Two panoramas, 126 years apart, from right to left: Tomb of Zechariah, the Tomb of Benei Hezir and Tomb of Absalom (less visible in the 1988 photograph).

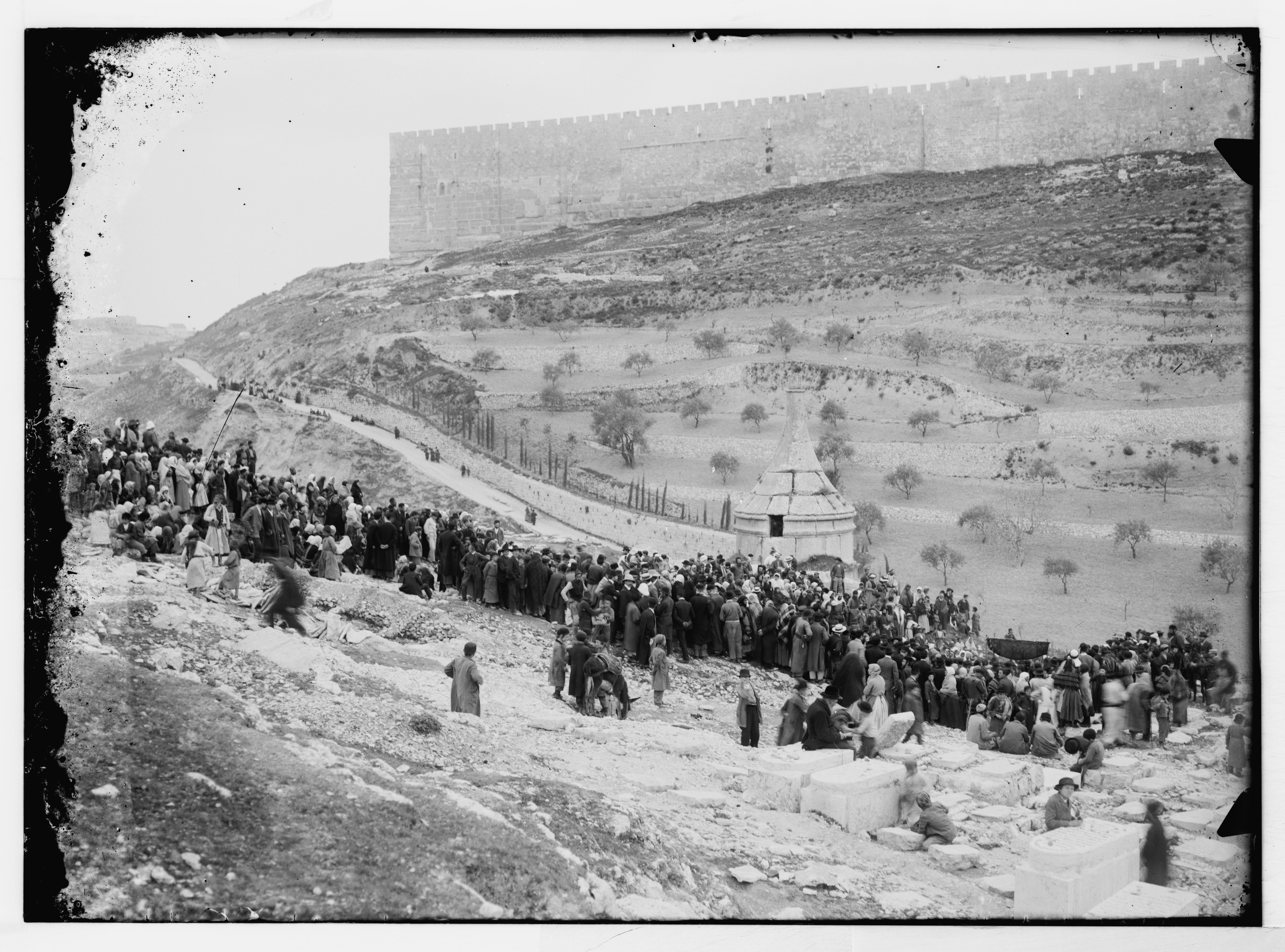
1890s[?]

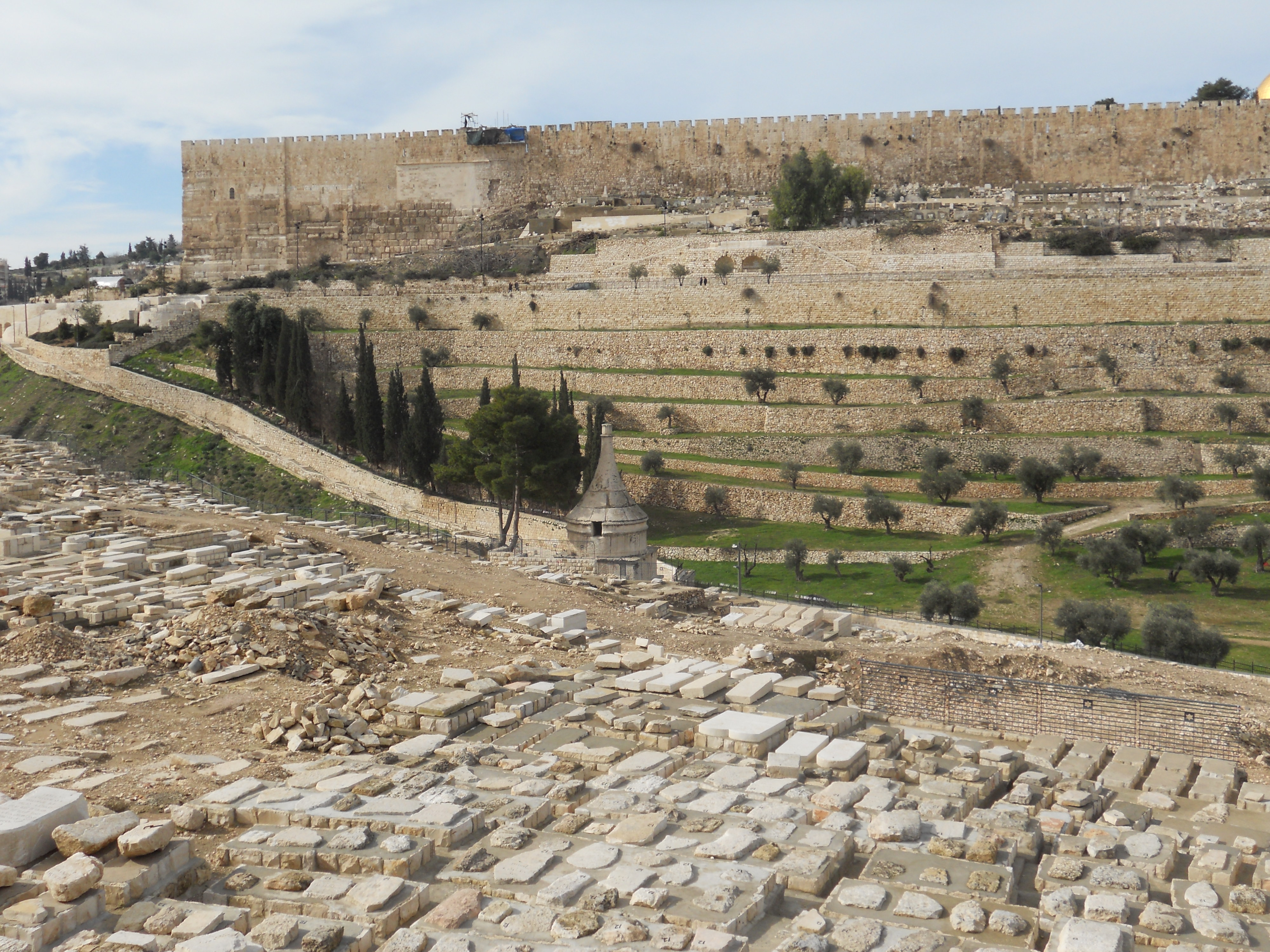
1989

Two panoramas, over 90 years apart, showing the Tomb of Absalom.

Absalom's Pillar is approximately 20 metres (66 ft) in height. The monument proper stands on a square base and consists of two distinct parts. The lower section is a monolith, hewn out of the rocky slope of the Mount of Olives, while the upper part, rising higher than the original bedrock, is built of neatly cut ashlars.

The lower half is thus a solid, almost perfectly cubical monolithic block, about 6 m (20 ft) square by 6.4 m (21 ft) high, surrounded on three sides by passageways which separate it from the vertically cut rock of the Mount of Olives. It is decorated from the outside on each side by pairs of Ionic half-columns, flanked in the corners by quarter-columns and pillars (a so-called distyle in antis arrangement). The four square facades are crowned by a Doric frieze of triglyphs and metopes and an Egyptian cornice.

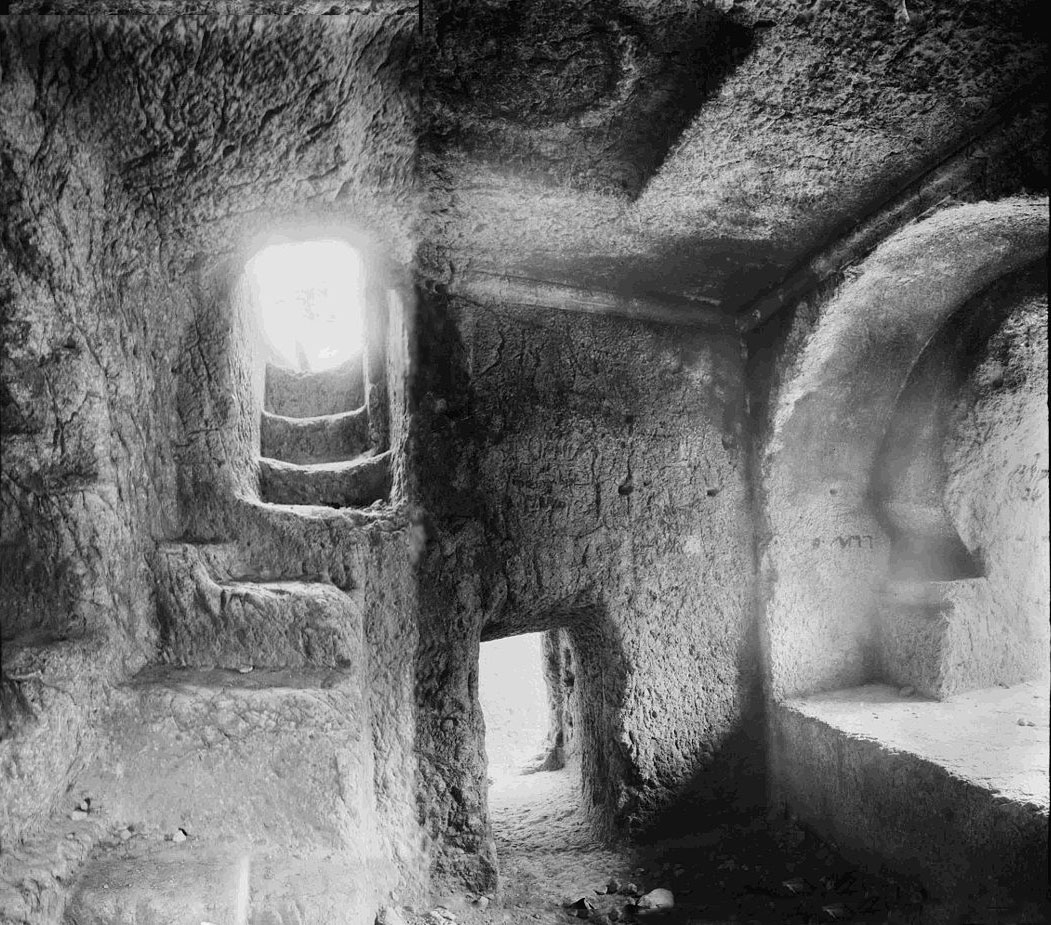
Inside view of Absalom's Pillar, Photoshop-morphed from the following two early 20th-century photos.

The upper, ashlar-built part of the monument consists of three differently-shaped segments: a square base set on top of the Egyptian cornice of the lower part, followed by a round drum crowned by a rope-shaped decoration, which sustains a conical roof with concave sides (the easily recognisable "hat"), topped by a half-closed lotus flower. The upper part of the monument corresponds to the outline of a classical tholos and is not unlike contemporary Nabatean structures from Petra.

On the inside, the upper part of the monument is mostly hollow, with a small arched entrance on the south side set above the seam area (where the masonry part starts). Inside this entrance a short staircase leads down to a burial chamber carved out of the solid, lower section. The chamber is 2.4 metres (7 ft 10 in) square, with arcosolium graves on two sides and a small burial niche. The tomb was found empty when first researched by archaeologists.

Italian architect and engineer, Ermete Pierotti (19th-century), rendered a description of the site in his seminal work, Jerusalem Explored.

== Dating ==
An analysis of the architectural styles used indicates that the monument's construction and its first stage of use happened during the 1st century AD.

The irregular-shaped holes made into the monument are of later date, probably from the Byzantine period. Even the original entrance has been widened in such rather defacing manner. See also under "Byzantine inscriptions" below.

== Traditional attribution ==
Absalom's shrine has traditionally been identified as the monument of Absalom, rebellious son of King David, based on a verse in the Book of Samuel:

Absalom in his lifetime had taken and reared up for himself a pillar, which is in the king's dale: for he said, I have no son to keep my name in remembrance: and he called the Monument after his own name: and it is called unto this day, Absalom's Monument.

— 2 Samuel 18:18

A "monument of Absalom" did exist in the days of Josephus, and was referred to in his Antiquities. The 19th-century English translation by Havercamp states that the "monument of Absalom" stood at a distance of "two furlongs" from Jerusalem.

The attribution of this particular monument to Absalom was quite persistent, although the Book of Samuel reports that Absalom's body was covered over with stones in a pit in the Wood of Ephraim (2 Samuel 18:17).

For centuries, it was the custom among passersby—Jews, Christians and Muslims—to throw stones at the monument. Residents of Jerusalem would bring their unruly children to the site to teach them what became of a rebellious son.

== Modern scholarship ==
The tomb's exterior design features a Doric frieze and Ionic columns, both being styles originating in ancient Greece and introduced into Judah during the Seleucid Empire, centuries after the death of Absalom. At the start of the 20th century, the monument was considered most likely to be that of Alexander Jannaeus, the Hasmonean king of Judea from 103 to 76 BCE. However, archaeologists have now dated the tomb to the 1st century AD.

In a 2013 conference, Professor Gabriel Barkay suggested that it could be the tomb of Herod Agrippa, the grandson of Herod the Great, based in part on the similarity to Herod's newly discovered tomb at Herodium.

== Cave of Jehoshaphat ==
=== Nefesh to the Tomb of Jehoshaphat ===
Archeologically, the so-called "Tomb of Absalom" is not only a burial structure in its own right, with its upper part serving as a nefesh (funeral monument) for the tomb in its lower part, but it was probably also meant as a nefesh for the adjacent burial cave system known as the "Cave" or "Tomb of Jehoshaphat", with which it forms one entity, built at the same time and following a single plan.

During the times of the Second Temple, many wealthy citizens of Jerusalem would have monuments built adjacent to their family burial caves. These monuments were built according to the architectural fashions of the time, many times with a pyramid on top, or in this case, a cone. Jewish sages of that era opposed the building of such monuments by saying: "You do not make nefashot for the righteous; their words are their commiseration."

== Byzantine inscriptions ==
In 2003, a mid-4th-century inscription on one of the walls of the monument was discovered. It reads, "This is the tomb of Zachariah, the martyr, the holy priest, the father of John". This suggests that at the time, the monument was considered to be the burial place of the Temple priest Zechariah, father of John the Baptist, who lived 400 or so years earlier than the inscription date.

A second inscription of the same age discovered in 2003 says the monument is "the tomb of Simeon who was a very just man and a very devoted el(der) and (who was) waiting for the consolation of the people". The words describing Simeon are identical to those from Luke 2:25 as they appear in the Codex Sinaiticus, a 4th-century manuscript of the Christian Bible.

The two inscriptions, discovered and deciphered by Joe Zias and Émile Puech, support the concept known from Byzantine period sources such as Theodosius (c. 530) that a tradition existed at the time, wrongly identifying the 1st-century monument as the tomb of James, the brother of Jesus; Zechariah, the father of John the Baptist; and Simeon, the old priest from the Gospel of Luke.

These two inscriptions are part of a secondary use of the monument during the Byzantine period, when Christians gave new interpretations to Jewish Second Temple period tombs from the Kidron Valley, associating them with characters and events from the New Testament, Apocrypha, and Christian traditions. The association of the so-called Tomb of Absalom with Zechariah, the father of John the Baptist, has led to confusion with the nearby so-called Tomb of Zechariah, associated by local folklore with a much earlier figure, the Temple priest Zechariah ben Jehoiada; however, that structure is not a tomb and might also be a monumental marker (nefesh) for the nearby burial cave of the priestly family of Hezir.

== Legends ==
According to a local legend, Napoleon fired a mortar at the tomb, and removed the shape of a hand that topped the conical roof. However, Napoleon never reached Jerusalem during his campaign in the Holy Land. Actually, the top of the monument is not at all broken, but is rather carved to resemble a lotus flower.

Muslims gave the tomb the Arabic name Tantur Fir'aun, "Pharaoh's Hat", due to the shape of its dome. Others explain the sense as meaning "Pharaoh's peak."

== Gallery ==
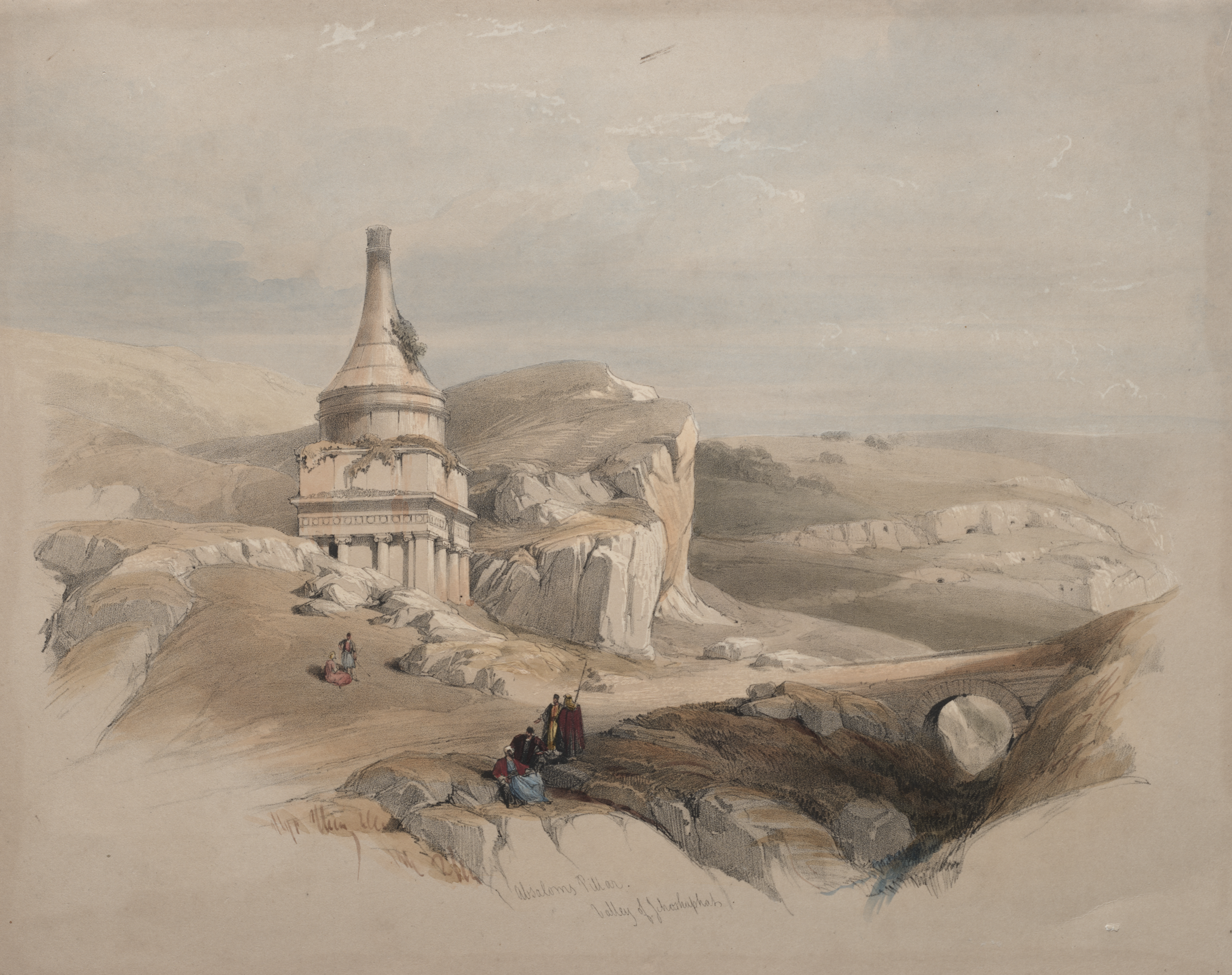
1839 image from The Holy Land, Syria, Idumea, Arabia, Egypt, and Nubia

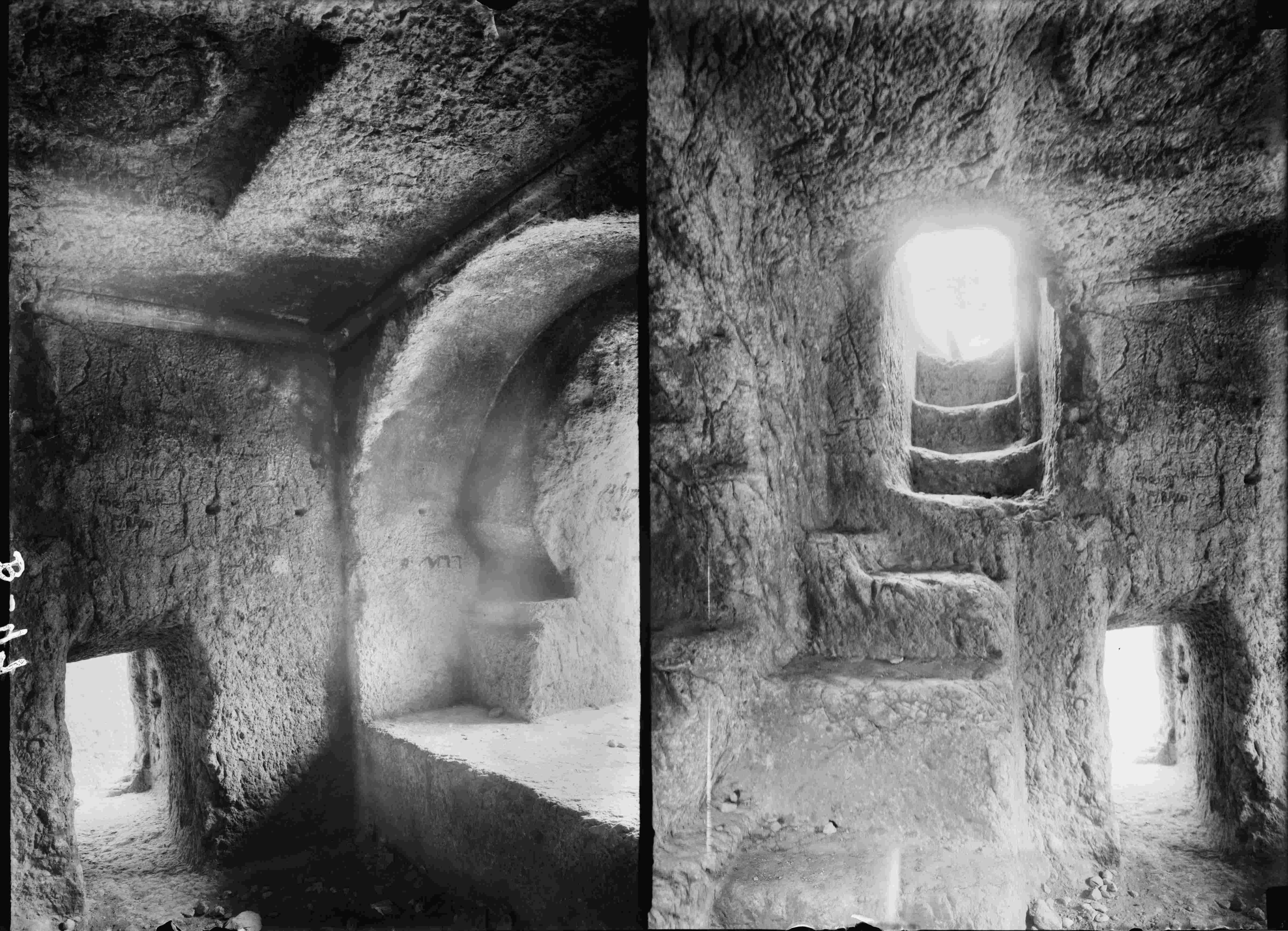
Original couple of pictures

Stereo card by T.W. Ingersoll

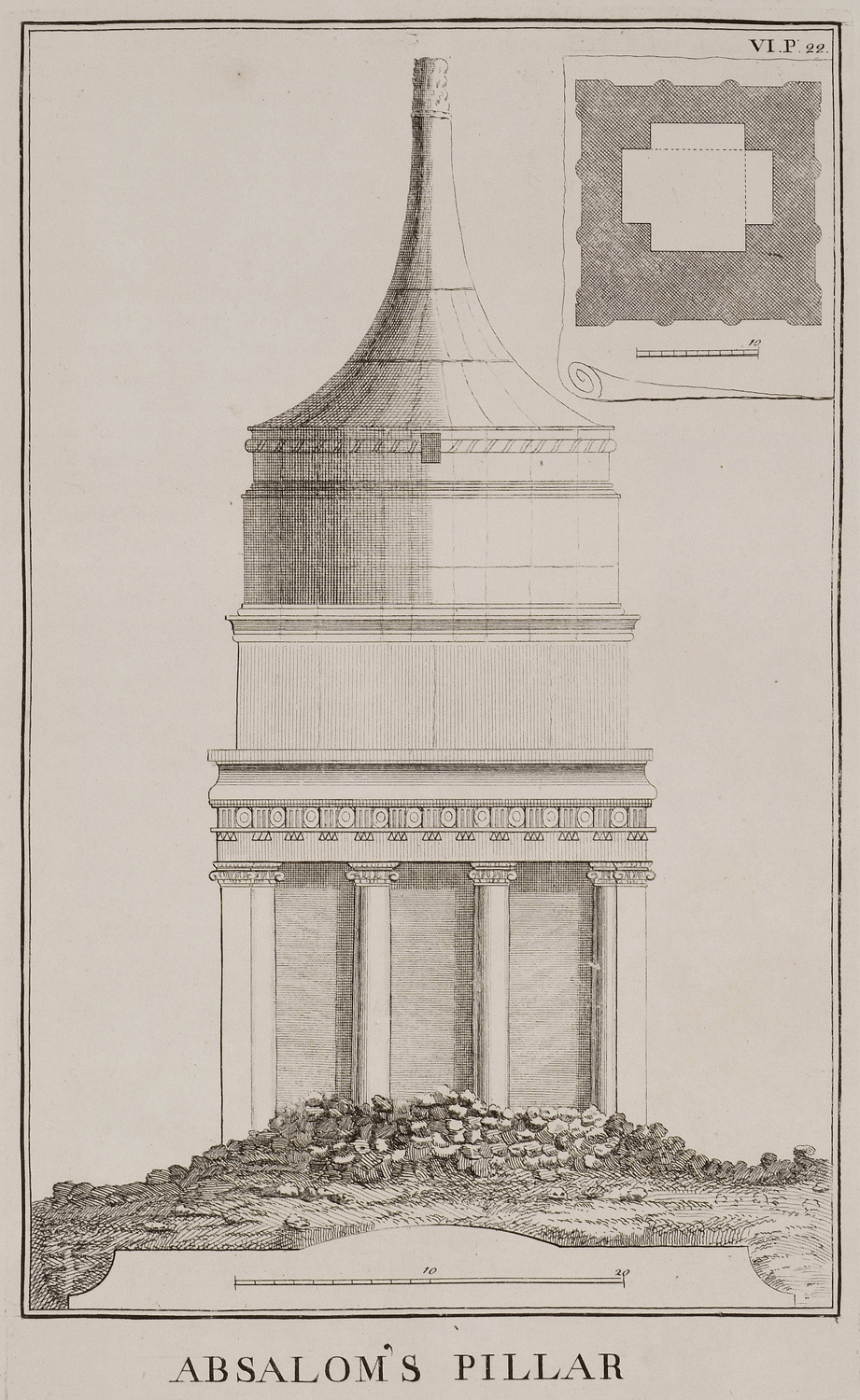
Image from 1745

== See also ==
- Mokata 'Abud
- Khirbet Kurkush
- Jason's Tomb
- Tomb of Benei Hezir
- Tomb of the Kings
- Rock-cut tombs in ancient Israel
- Silwan necropolis
- Tourism in the State of Palestine
