= Nefesh (group) =

- Formation: 1992
- Members: over 750
- President: Rabbi Simcha Feuerman, LCSW-R
- Executive Director: Miriam Turk, LCSW
- Website: www.nefesh.org

Nefesh (Hebrew: נפש, lit. 'Soul') is a networking organization for Torah-observant mental health professionals internationally.

Nefesh was founded in 1992, to bring Orthodox Jewish professionals and rabbis together to address mental health issues that in a professional and communal environment. There are over 750 members worldwide. Notable member and rabbinic advisers include Rabbi Dovid Cohen, Rabbi Dr. Abraham Twerski, and Rabbi Tzvi Hersh Weinreb.

The main office is located in Brooklyn and the current president is Rabbi Simcha Feuerman. There are additional chapters in Australia, Beverly Hills, Israel, Canada, United Kingdom and South America.

There are national and international conferences held on an annual basis since 2001. In the past, these conferences have taken place in New York, Miami, Baltimore, Norfolk, and Israel. In addition, international workshops dealing with contemporary issues have taken place in many of these locations. These conferences and workshops are approved for continuing education by the State Board Office of New York.

== Membership ==
Nefesh-International is an interdisciplinary organization of Orthodox Jewish mental health professionals providing leadership and interdisciplinary education in the field of personal, family, and community mental health. The members are Torah-observant psychologists, social workers, psychiatrists, marriage and family therapists, professional counselors, psychiatric nurses, chemical dependency counselors, psychotherapists, guidance and pastoral counselors, and graduate students. Affiliates include Orthodox Rabbis, Jewish educators, attorneys, and allied professionals. Nefesh International is funded primarily funded through program revenue.

== Issues addressed ==
In the Orthodox Jewish community a stigma exists towards mental health. This issue can create a situation where individuals and families are not addressing mental health conditions. Orthodox Jewish mental health professionals encounter other challenges as the community is closed and insular and it difficult to attain anonymous, yet culturally attuned, care. For example, it is not seen as appropriate for men and women to shake hands with someone of the opposite gender, and an uninformed therapist might not be aware of these and other sensitivities. Nonetheless, in these closed communities issues exist which are parallel to those found in the contemporary world at large — gender, family, and community related issues. The group stays abreast of the latest research while transferring the findings to their specialized communities.

The group has reached out to Orthodox Jewish caregivers both psychologists and others in related fields to discuss shared concerns, issues and solutions that are acceptable in their religious communities.
