= Nefesh =

Semitic burial monument

A nefesh (from Hebrew: נֶפֶשׁ, lit. 'soul'; pl. נֶפָשׁוֹת, nefashot) is a Semitic funerary monument typically placed near a grave, intended to be seen from a distance as a visible marker of the deceased.

== Judea ==
=== Jerusalem ===
Some examples of monumental funerary sculpture near Jerusalem bear inscriptions that include the term nephesh, and the word is generally accepted as a reference to the pyramid structure above or beside the tomb.

==== Tomb of Absalom ====
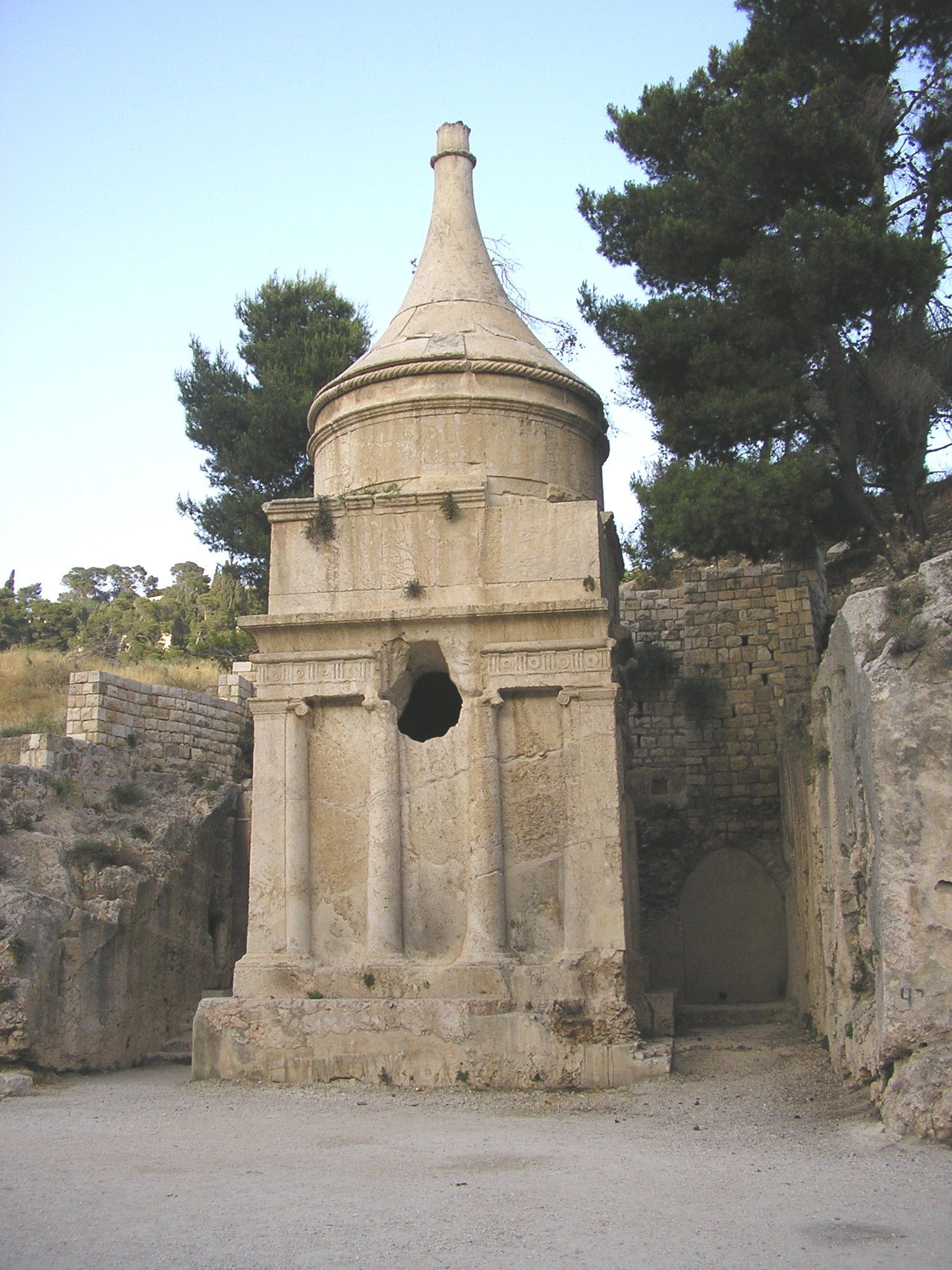
Yad Avshalom in Kidron Valley

Standing among a group of tombs in Jerusalem, the tomb of Absalom is an important example of Late Second Temple funerary architecture. To the lower left of the entrance to the tomb, the word nephesh is inscribed in Greek. In this context, the Greek nephesh is translated as two Hebrew-Aramaic words as nephesh and qubr, now interpreted as an amalgam of "tomb" and "stele." The carved rock is thus a memorial that evokes the essence or spirit of the deceased.

==== Jason's Tomb ====
Dated to the first century BCE, Jason's Tomb bears an Aramaic inscription that states: "because I built for you a tomb (nephesh) and a memorial (qubr), be in peace in Jer[u]sa[le]m."

==== Tomb of Benei Hezir ====
The Tomb of Benei Hezir also bears an epithet in Hebrew that states: "This is the tomb and the stele/memorial (nephesh) of Eleazar...".

=== Horvat Midras ===
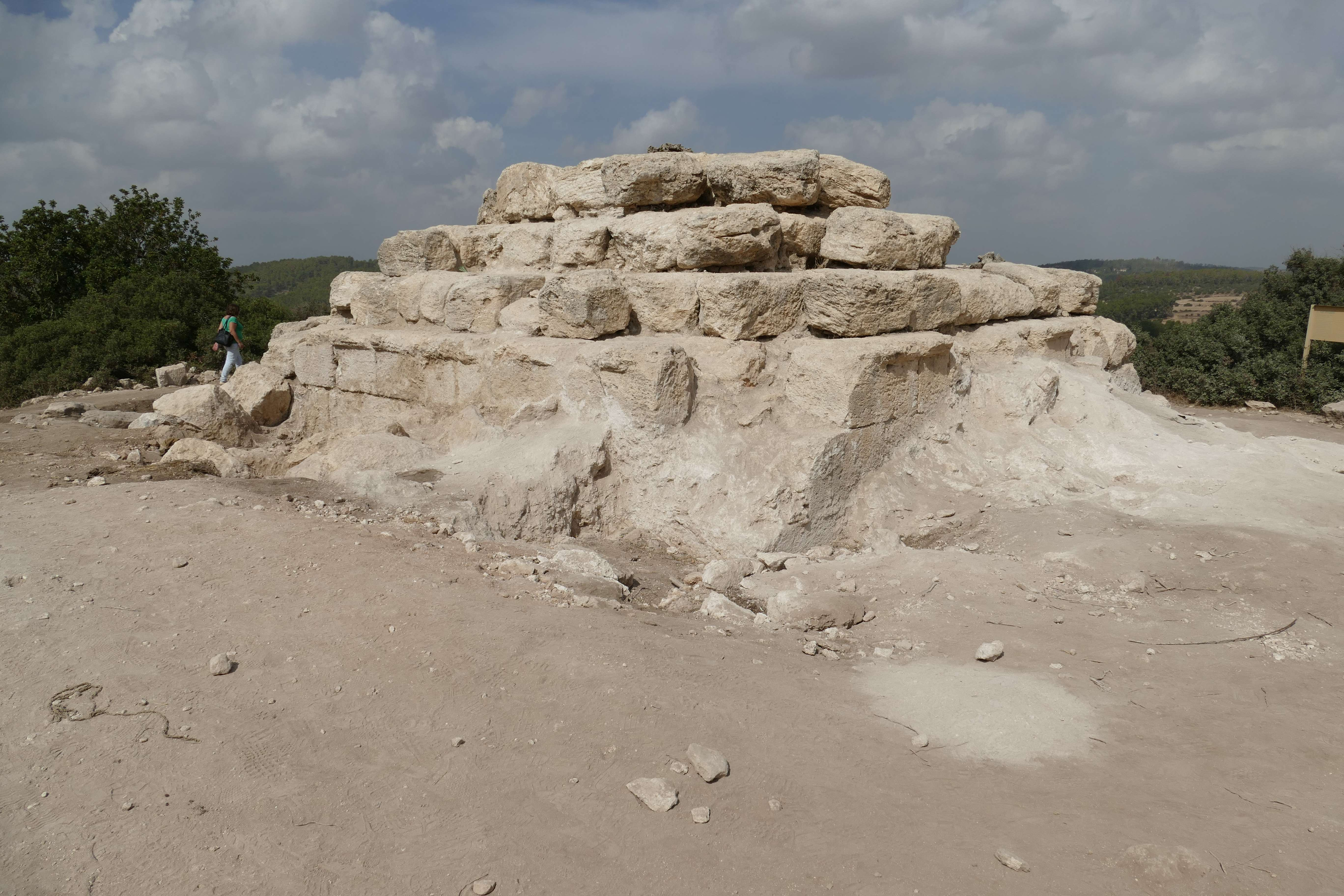
Remains of the nefesh at Horvat Midras

A rural example of a nefesh outside Jerusalem is found at Horvat Midras, an archaeological site containing the remains of a once-prosperous rural settlement in the Judean Foothills. This monument consists of a stepped pyramid built atop a 10-by-10-metre podium, reaching a total height of about seven metres and prominently positioned on a hilltop for maximum visibility. It was likely built by a wealthy family, possibly one whose influence rose through connections with the Herodian dynasty.

== Nabataea ==
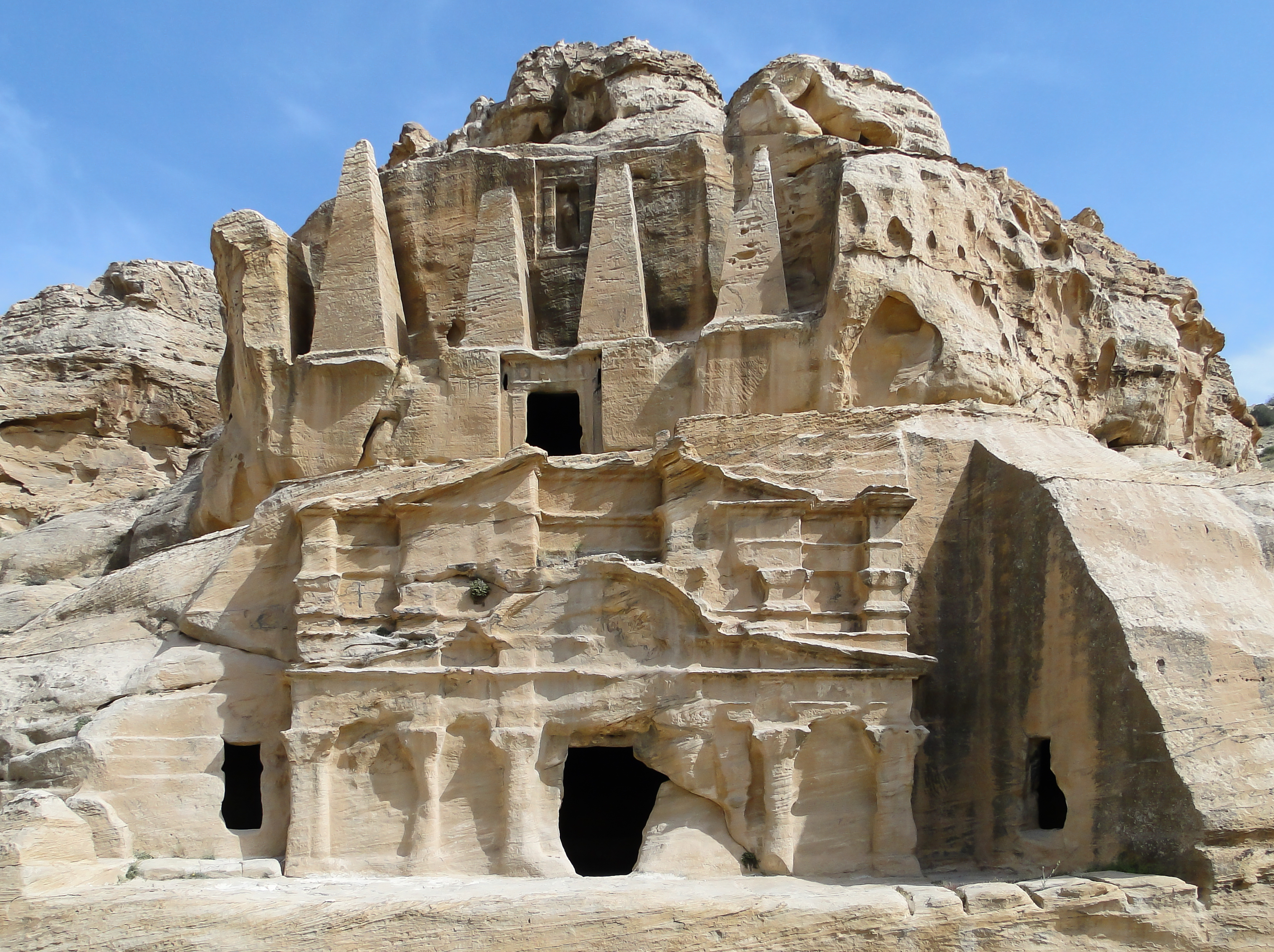
Obelisk tomb and Bab el-Siq Triclinium, Petra, Jordan.

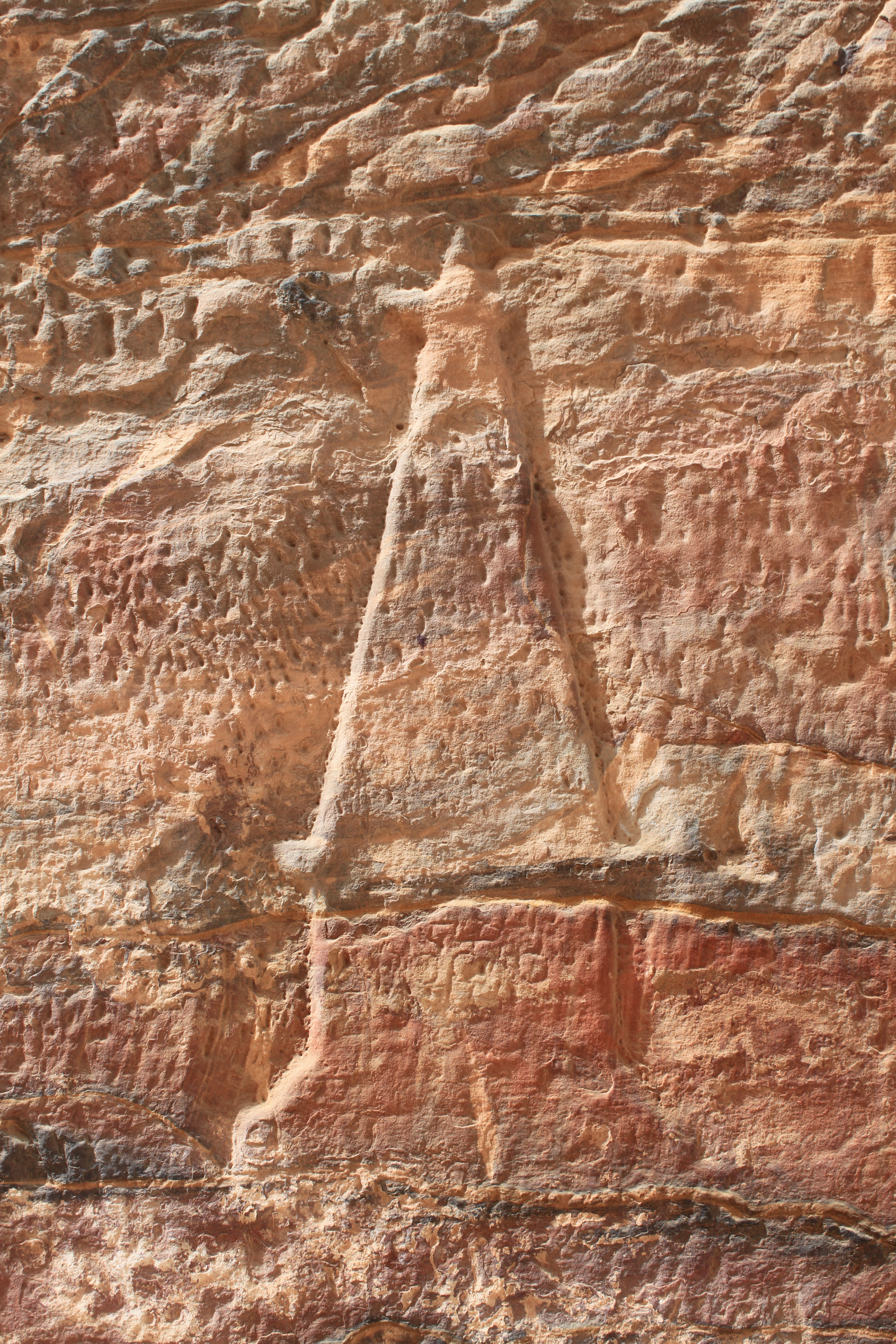
Carving of a nefesh on the rock face near Tomb 70, Petra

In a Nabataean votive inscription from Salkhad, an Aramaic heap of stones set up in memorial is described as "for Allat and her wgr", a term equated to the Hasaitic nephesh. In Sabaean, this term could mean a tumulus above a tomb, while in Arabic this term could indicate a grotto or a tomb. The term nephesh is also linked to the Greek stele.

An aniconic culture, the Nabataean representation of deities lacked figural imagery. Related to betyls, nepheshes served as aniconic memorial markers for the dead. Unlike the Israelite prohibition of the graven image, Nabataean aniconism allows anthropomorphic representation of deities but demonstrates a preference for non- figural imagery. Betyls are one form of Nabataean aniconic sculpture. Often explained as representations of Dushara, the central Nabataean deity, betyls occur in a wide variety of shapes, groupings, and niches. This variety suggests that betyls may be representative of other deities as well.

The Nabataean nephesh is a standing stone, obeliskoid in shape, often featuring a blossom/pinecone or stylized crown on the top. Roughly carved or engraved in bas-relief, these structures are often set upon a base that bears the name of the deceased. Occurring outside and inside tombs, some are engraved near or in votive niches. However, many nepheshes can be found unconnected from tombs, and many line the paths to Petra or along other protruding rock faces such as those of the Siq. An example of this type of funerary marker can be found in the Obelisk Tomb and Bab el-Siq Triclinium, Petra, Jordan.
