= Umm al-Amad, Jerusalem =

Ancient rock-cut tomb in Jerusalem

Umm al-'Amed
- أُمّ العَمَد (Arabic)
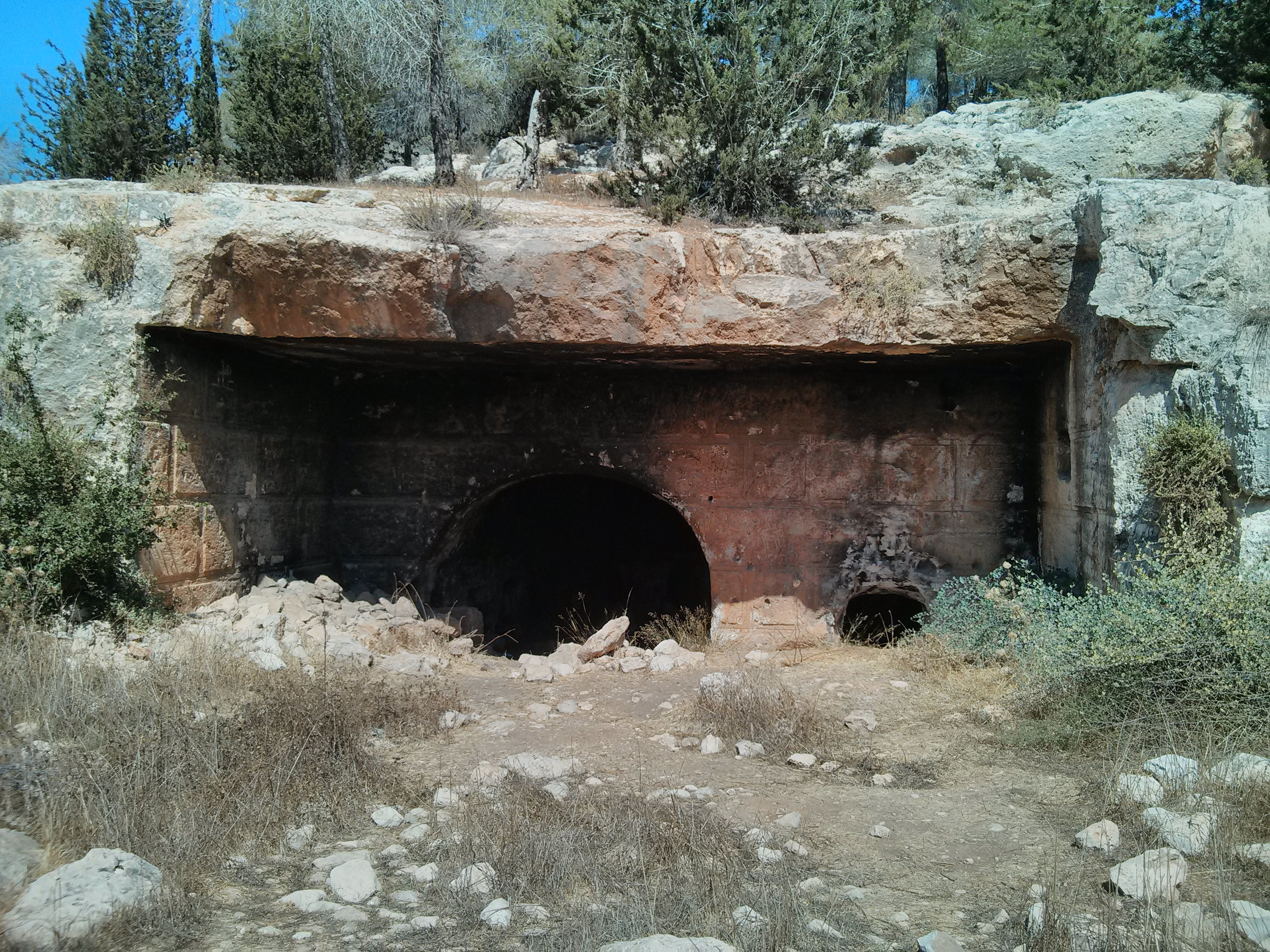

- Location within Jerusalem
- 31°48′19″N 35°13′38″E
- Type: rock-cut tomb
- Cultures: Second Temple Judaism
- Location: Jerusalem

History
- Built: 1st century BCE

Site notes
- Material: limestone
- Condition: In ruins

Umm al-'Amed (Arabic: أُمّ العَمَد, lit. 'Mother of the columns'), or Mugharet Umm el-Amed (Arabic: مغارة أُمّ العَمَد, lit. 'Cave of the mother of the columns'), is a monumental rock-cut tomb located in Wadi Ramot, north of ancient Jerusalem. Part of the necropolis of Second Temple-era Jerusalem, the tomb features a classical façade and finely carved masonry, characteristic of the elite Jewish burial architecture of late Second Temple Judea.

== Location ==
The tomb is located in Wadi Ramot, north of ancient Jerusalem, and was part of a necropolis that surrounded the area during the Second Temple period. It is located 900 meters south of the core of Shuafat.

== Description ==
The façade of the tomb at Umm al-'Amed features a distyle in antis arrangement, with two columns standing between projecting antae. The columns rest on Attic bases and are believed to have originally supported Ionic capitals. Above them runs a Doric frieze carved with rosette motifs, surmounted by a hybrid Doric-Ionic cornice. The entablature extends beyond the limits of the tomb's entrance, continuing across shallow pilasters on either side of the façade.

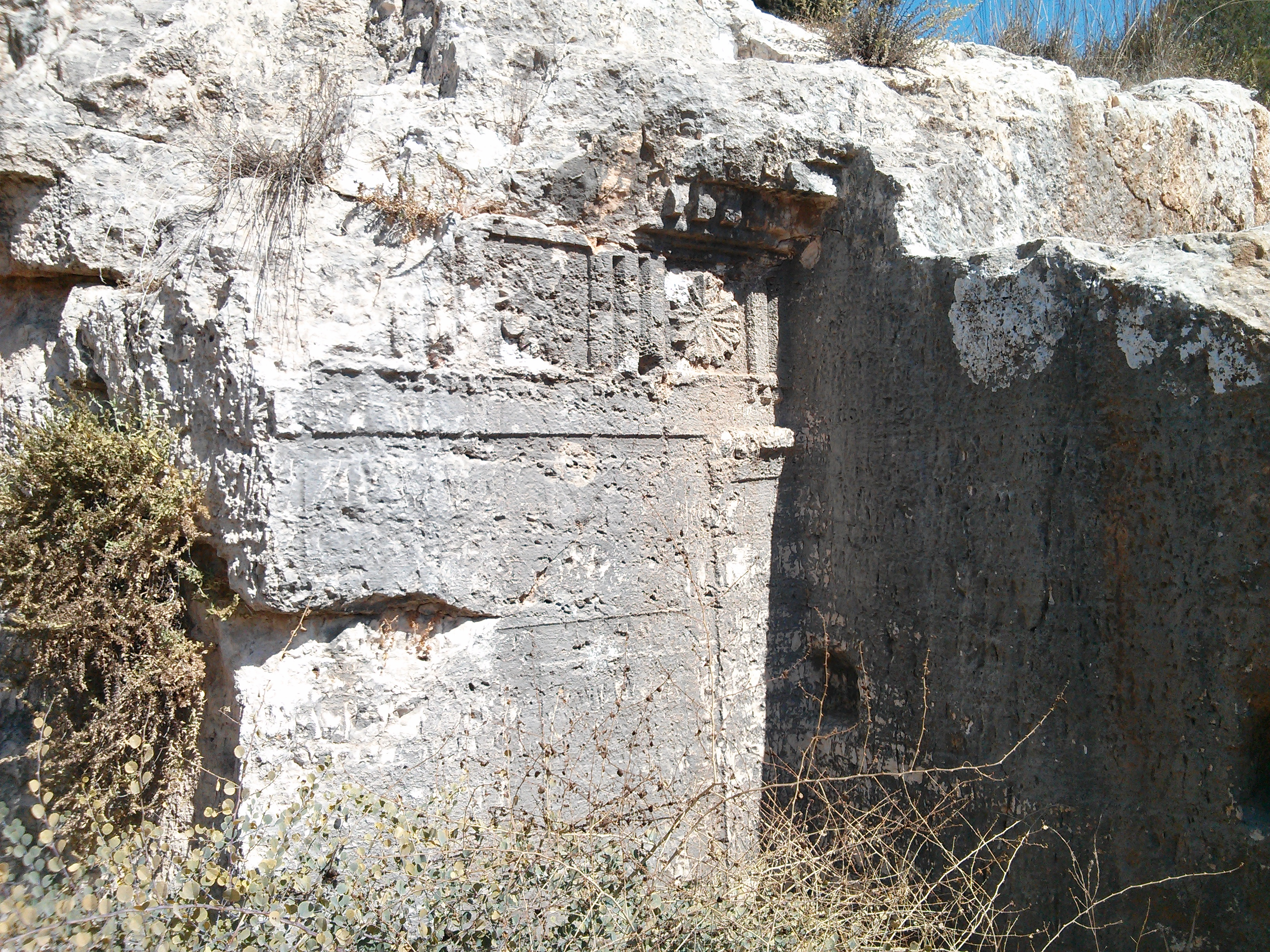
The frieze, featuring metopes adorned with rosette motifs alongside triglyphs

The tomb is built of carved ashlar courses with drafted margins, a decorative technique imitating the stonework of Herod's Temple Mount enclosure walls and the northeast tower of the Herodian citadel (now part of the Tower of David complex) in Jerusalem, as well as the Herodian walls at two sites in Hebron: the Mamre site and the Cave of the Patriarchs. The top draft of each carved block is slightly wider than the bottom, a feature characteristic of Herodian stonework. The surfaces are claw-dressed, while the flat bosses lack the point-picking seen on the originals.

=== Comparative context ===
The tomb at Umm al-'Amed has served as a reference point in the study of Second Temple-period tombs beyond Jerusalem. Scholars have noted architectural parallels with other contemporary monuments, including the 1st century BCE Deir ed-Darb, a rock-cut tomb in Qarawat Bani Hassan, Samaria, which is thought to have been modeled after it.

== Research history ==
The site was thoroughly documented by R. A. Stewart Macalister in 1904 under the title "Mugharet Umm el-'Anab." In 1947, it was described by archaeologist Nahman Avigad under the name "Mugharet Umm el-'Amad".

Based on the use of Herodian-style masonry and late Hellenistic architectural features, Avigad dated the site to the reign of Herod (r. 37–4 BCE).

== See also ==
- Deir ed-Darb
- Tomb of Absalom
- Tombs of the Kings
- Tomb of Zechariah
- Khirbat al-Simia
- Khirbet Kurkush

== Bibliography ==
- Avigad, Nahman (1947). "Architectural Observations on Some Rock-Cut Tombs". Palestine Exploration Quarterly. 79 (2): 112–122. doi:10.1179/peq.1947.79.2.112. ISSN 0031-0328.
- Jacobson, David M. (2000-01-01). "Decorative Drafted-margin Masonry in Jerusalem and Hebron and its Relations". Levant. 32 (1): 135–154. doi:10.1179/lev.2000.32.1.135. ISSN 0075-8914.
- Peleg-Barkat, Orit (2012). "The relative chronology of tomb façades in Early Roman Jerusalem and power displays by the élite". Journal of Roman Archaeology. 25: 403–418. doi:10.1017/S1047759400001276.
