= Jason's Tomb =

1st-century BCE Jewish tomb in Jerusalem

- קבר יאסון (Hebrew)
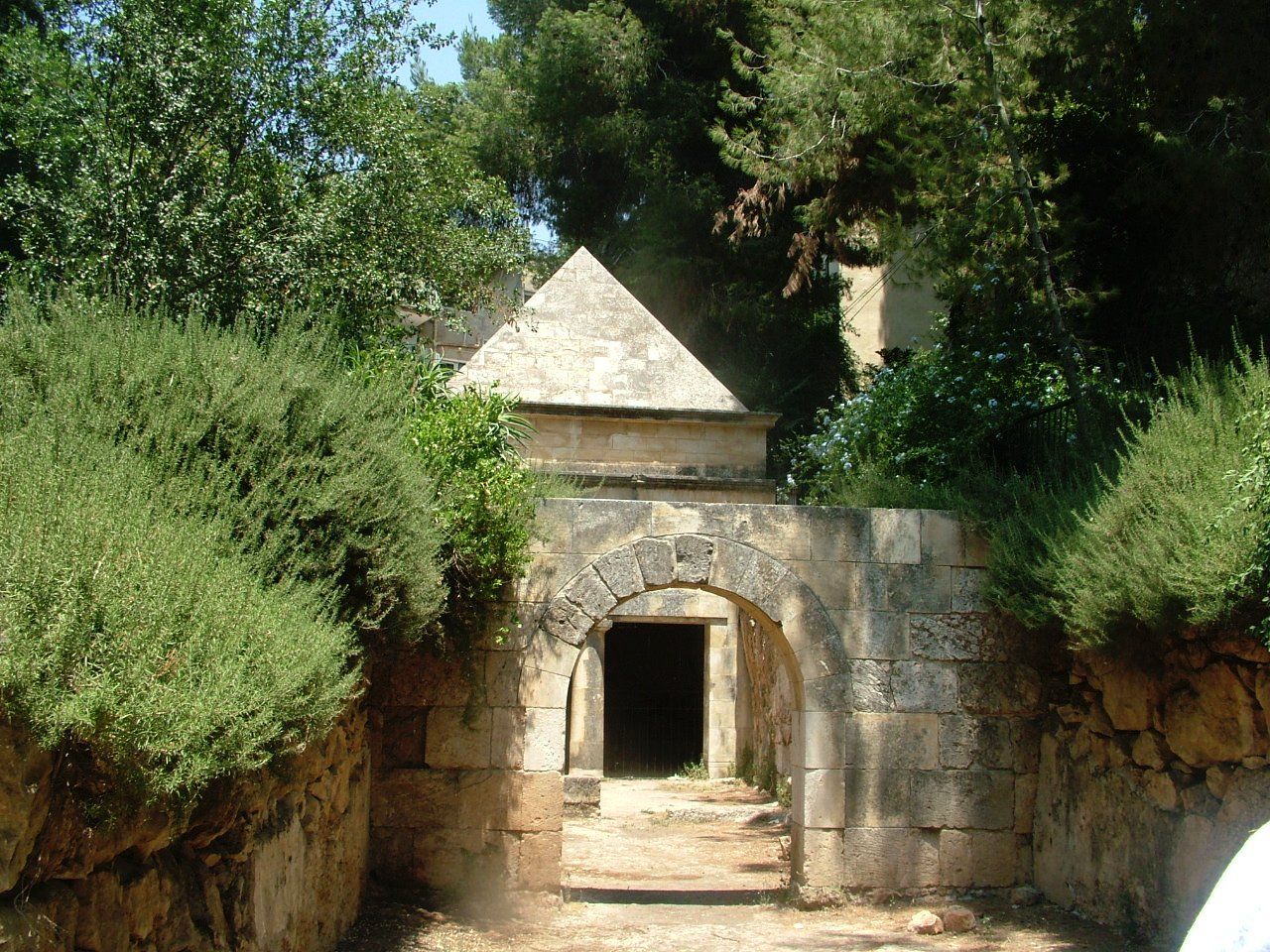
- Entrance to Jason's Tomb
- Interactive map of Jason's Tomb
- 31°46.388′N 35°12.788′E
- Location: Rehavia

History
- Built: 1st century BCE

Site notes
- Material: Stone
- Discovered: 1956
- Condition: Preserved
- Public access: Yes

Jason's Tomb (Hebrew: קבר יאסון, romanized: Qever Yāson) is a Jewish rock-cut tomb located in the Rehavia neighborhood of Jerusalem, dating to the late second or early first century BCE, during the Hasmonean period. The tomb features a courtyard, a multi-chambered burial system with kokhim (niches), and a distinctive pyramid-shaped roof over its entrance. Inscriptions in Greek and Aramaic referring to a person named Jason, along with decorative motifs such as a ship, provide insight into the identity and social status of the deceased.

Jason's Tomb is one of the earliest and most prominent examples of monumental Jewish tomb architecture in Second Temple-era Jerusalem.

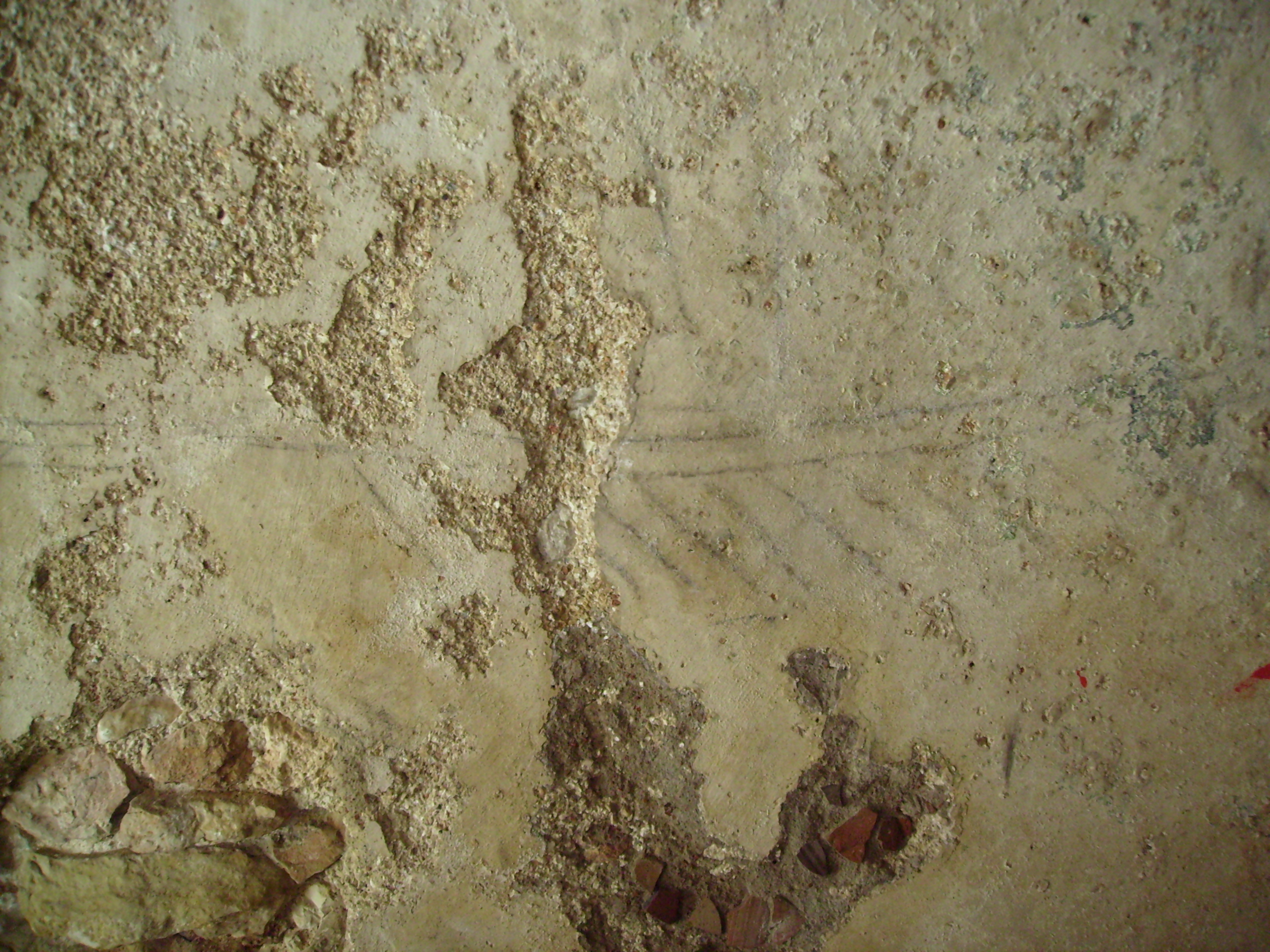
Drawing of ship

== Discovery and research ==
The tomb was discovered in 1956 and the authorities in charge of antiquities expropriated the site from its owners in order to preserve it. Levi Yizhaq Rahmani excavated it and published his findings in 1967.

The tomb is considered to date from the time of Alexander Jannaeus (r. 103–76 BCE). A ceramic assemblage found here was dated by one expert, Rachel Bar-Nathan, to no later than the 31 BC Judea earthquake, a date not readily accepted by everyone. Coins found at the site date to the first third of the first century CE. The tomb was finally blocked in 30/31 CE.

== Description ==
The building consists of a courtyard and a single Doric column decorating the entrance to the burial chamber, topped with a reconstructed pyramid-shaped roof. Among the carved inscriptions in Greek and Aramaic is one that laments the deceased Jason: "A powerful lament make for Jason, son of P... (my brother) peace ... who hast built thyself a tomb, Elder rest in peace." The individuals buried at the cave appear to represent three generations of a wealthy Jerusalemite family.

Another inscription states that Jason sailed to the coast of Egypt. Inside the cave are eight burial niches. To make room for additional burials the bones were later removed to the charnel space in front.

== See also ==
- Jason (high priest)
- Rock-cut tombs in Israel
- Archaeology in Israel
- Umm al-Amad
- Deir ed-Darb
- Khirbet Kurkus
- Tomb of the kings
- Tomb of Benei Hezir
- Mokata 'Aboud
