= Qarawat Bani Hassan =

- Municipality type D (Village council)

Arabic transcription(s)
  - Arabic: قراوة بني حسان
  - Latin: Qarawet Bani Hassan (official); Qarawat Bani Hasan, Qurawa Ibn Hasan (unofficial)
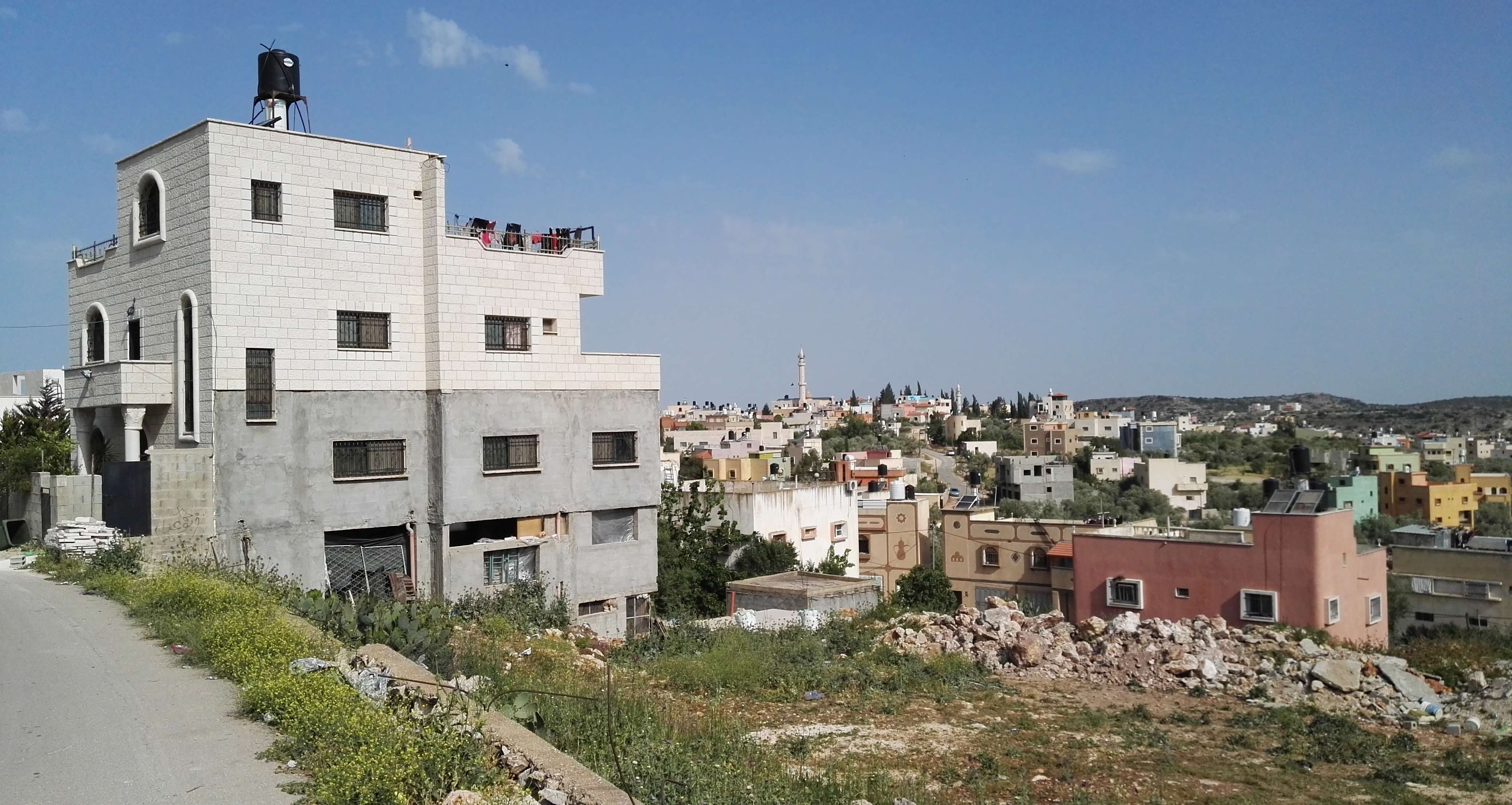

- Location of Qarawat Bani Hassan within Palestine
- Coordinates: 32°07′41″N 35°05′56″E
- Palestine grid: 159/170
- State: State of Palestine
- Governorate: Salfit

Government
  - Type: Village council
  - Head of Municipality: Nasim 'Asi

Area
  - Total: 9.7 km^{2} (3.7 sq mi)
- Elevation: 391 m (1,283 ft)

Population (2017)
  - Total: 5,513
  - Density: 570/km^{2} (1,500/sq mi)
- Name meaning: "The towns of Ibn Hasan"

Qarawat Bani Hassan (Arabic: قراوة بني حسان) is a Palestinian town in the Salfit Governorate of the state of Palestine, 30 kilometers southwest of Nablus and 8 kilometers northwest of Salfit in the northern West Bank. According to the Palestinian Central Bureau of Statistics, the town had a population of 5,513 in 2017.

Its total land area is 9,684 dunams, of which 507 dunams is built-up area. Since the 1995 Interim Agreement on the West Bank and the Gaza Strip, 10.7% of its municipal jurisdiction is under the civil administration of the Palestinian National Authority and the security of Israel, while 89.2% is under complete Israeli control.

== Location ==
Qarawat Bani Hassan is 8.9 kilometers (5.5 mi) north-west of Salfit. It is bordered by Deir Istiya and Haris to the east, Sarta to the south, Biddya to the west, and Deir Istiya to the north.

== Archaeology ==
Potsherds from the Iron Age II, Iron Age II/Persian, Byzantine, Byzantine/Umayyad, Umayyad/Abbasid, Crusader/Ayyubid and Mamluk eras have been found. Qarawat Bani Hassan was examined in 1873, and several major remains were found, some of possible Byzantine origin.

Archaeologist Shimon Dar identified the site with the ancient village of Qerutim, known from historical sources for its production of high-quality wine during the Second Temple period. The many winepresses and watchtowers in the Qarawat Bani Hassan area suggest local viticulture was thriving and well-connected to Jerusalem. According to Dar, a Jewish population inhabited the site until the Jewish–Roman wars, after which Samaritans and other non-Jewish groups became predominant. In the context of this Samaritan presence, Qarawat Bani Hassan has been identified with Qarawa, a locality mentioned in later Samaritan sources as the site of a synagogue built by Baba Rabba. Further support for Samaritan activity at the site comes from the discovery of a nearby kokh tomb containing lamps decorated with Samaritan-style menorah motifs; the tomb remained in use through late antiquity before being abandoned during the Byzantine period.

In the village's northern section stands an ancient structure, approximately 10x10 meters in size and 4–5 meters in height, built with well-dressed stones in a header and stretcher pattern. Finkelstein and Lederman propose it likely dates back to the Herodian period.

=== Deir ed-Derb ===
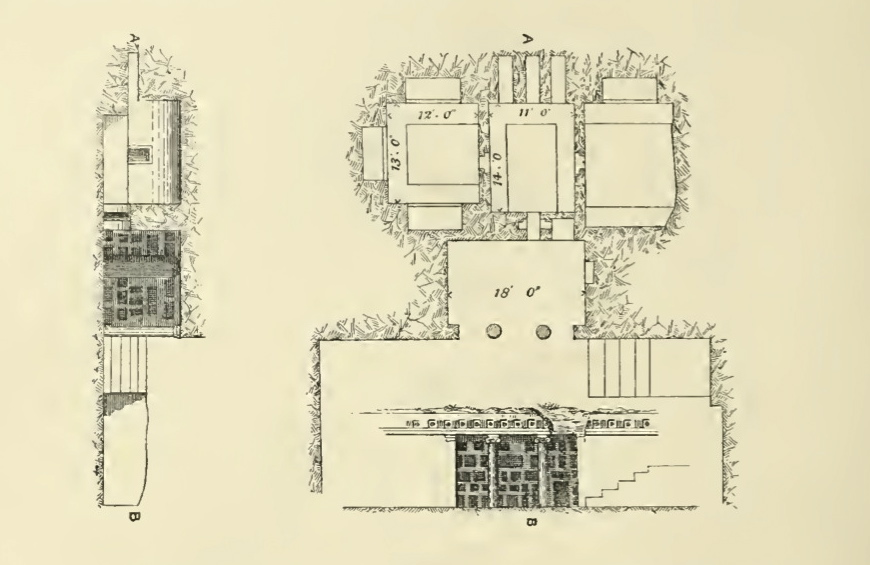
Section through Deir ed Derb, 1873

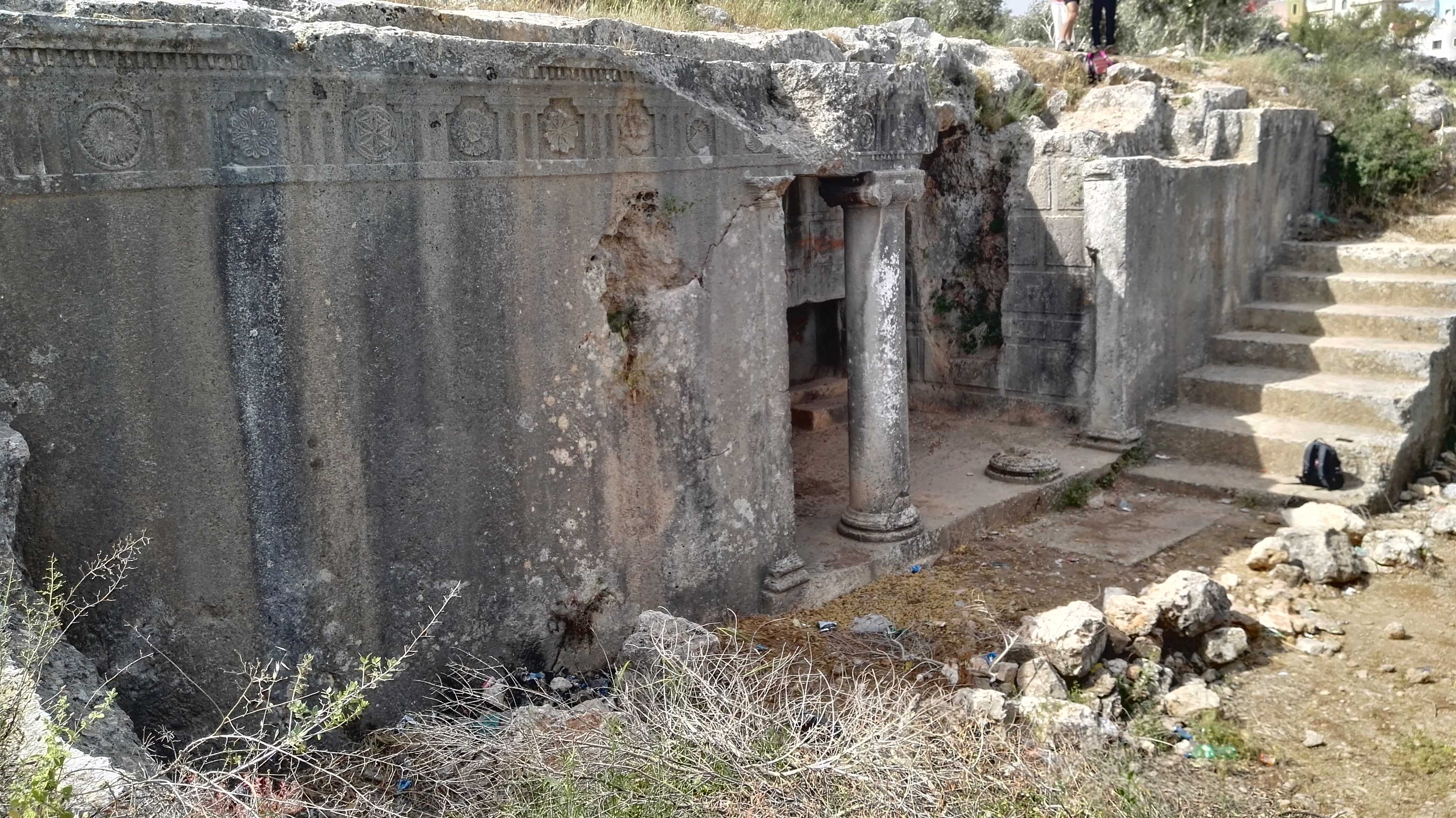
Deir ed Derb, 2017

About 1/2-mile SE of the village centre is Deir ed-Darb ("The monastery of the road"), described as "one of the finest sepulchral monuments in the country". In 1873 when it was visited, it was described as having three chambers. The portico had a 50 ft long Doric cornice in front, and was supported by two Ionic columns and two pilasters. 15 triglyphs and 14 rosettes were cut, where all the rosettes were of different designs. It looked as if the work was not quite finished, as not all the gutta had been carved. The walls of the portico are carved to resemble irregular drafted masonry.

The structure bears a strong resemblance to some tombs by Jerusalem, which have been dated to 1st century CE. Archaeologist Shimon Dar, who excavated the site in 1978, suggested it was constructed either during the Hasmonean period or under Herod's reign. Archaeologist Yitzhak Magen has linked Deir ed-Derb and other similar tombs in Samaria (including Khirbet Kurkush and Mokata 'Abud) to the departure of Jewish craftsmen from Jerusalem to Samaria before the siege of Jerusalem in 70 CE. Orit Peleg-Barkat, on the other hand, suggested that these tombs were constructed by local Jewish elites who were inspired by the elaborate graves of the Jewish elite in Jerusalem of the late Second Temple period.

=== Kulat Ferdus ===
Kulat Ferdus is a tower, situated in the middle of the village, and named after a king whose tomb is to the south (beside Deir ed Derb). In 1873 it was described as being inhabited, and in very good condition. The size was 40 times 45 feet, and 20 to 30 feet high. The outer walls were 5 feet thick and 1 1/2 to 5 feet long. The courses were from 1 foot 8 inches to 2 feet tall. The stones were drafted, cut 4 inches broad and 1 inch deep. The building was entered through two doors on the east side. There were six chambers inside, about 6 by 12 feet in size and with a semicircular vaulting. The building appeared of Byzantine origin, possibly earlier.

=== Burj el-Yakhur ===
Burj el-Yakhur is a two-story tower, located in the upper part of the village, to the south. The walls are 6–8 feet thick. The ground floor (basement) is about 48 times 24 feet, 12–15 feet high, and has a fine barrel vault. To the left of the entrance, there is a stair leading up to the first floor. According to Pringle, this tower dates from the Crusader area.

=== Sheikh 'Aly el-Amanat ===
An above-average-sized mosque located at the south-east end of the village. When examined in 1873, a large sunken structure was found adjoining it on the western side. Part of this structure was used as a birkeh ("pool"). According to Pringle, this mosque (called Jami al-Umari), dates from the Mamluk area. Following a 1975 excavation, Dar dated the mosque to the Abbasid period. The structure is situated on the foundations of an earlier building that featured columns and bases, corresponding to the church mentioned by both Guerin and the SWP team. Architectural fragments, including limestone columns, column drums marked with Greek letters, glazed pottery fragments, and a limestone door in the style of the Second Temple period, were recovered, along with pottery and glassware dating from the 4th to 7th centuries CE. According to Dar, these findings indicate that the site was not a church but rather a public building in use during late antiquity.

== History ==
Amr ibn al-A'as, a prominent Arab commander of the Rashidun army, was said to have been injured in the village. According to local tradition, a tree was planted on the spot where his blood was spilled. The story was written up in the village history in the year 1919. In 1225 Arab geographer Yaqut al-Hamawi noted that Qarawat Bani Hassan was "a village in the District of Nablus."

=== Ottoman era ===
In 1596, Qarawat Bani Hasan appeared in Ottoman tax registers as being in the nahiya of Jabal Qubal, part of the Sanjak of Nablus. It had a population of 13 households and 3 bachelors, all Muslim. The villagers paid a fixed tax rate of 33.3% on various products, such as wheat, barley, summer crops, olive trees, goats and beehives, in addition to "occasional revenues"; a total of 2,000 akçe. Potsherds from the early Ottoman era have been found.

In the 18th and 19th centuries, Qarawat Bani Hassan formed part of the highland region known as Jūrat ‘Amra or Bilād Jammā‘īn. Situated between Dayr Ghassāna in the south and the present Route 5 in the north, and between Majdal Yābā in the west and Jammā‘īn, Mardā and Kifl Ḥāris in the east, this area served, according to historian Roy Marom, "as a buffer zone between the political-economic-social units of the Jerusalem and the Nablus regions. On the political level, it suffered from instability due to the migration of the Bedouin tribes and the constant competition among local clans for the right to collect taxes on behalf of the Ottoman authorities."

In 1838 Kurawa Beni Hasan was noted as a Muslim village, in Jurat Merda, south of Nablus.

French explorer Victor Guérin visited the village in 1870, and estimated it as having about 150 inhabitants. He described the town as being in decline, but with great remains of former better times. When he was visiting, a squad of bashi-bazouks were rounding up 35 villagers, and taking them to Nablus as they had not paid their taxes.

In 1870/1871 (1288 AH), an Ottoman census listed the village with a population of 76 households in the nahiya (sub-district) of Jamma'in al-Awwal, subordinate to Nablus.

In the 1882 "Survey of Western Palestine", the village (called Kurawa Ibn Hasan) was described as:

partly ruinous, but evidently at one time a place of great importance, with ancient tombs, one of great beauty, and rude stone towers. Its ancient name is given by the natives as Sham et Tawil. The little mosque of Sheikh 'Aly el 'Amanat stands apparendy over the apse of a church. The supply of water is from wells and cisterns.

=== British Mandate era ===
In the 1922 census of Palestine conducted in 1922 by the British Mandate authorities, Karawa or Qarawa had an entirely Muslim population of 313, while in the 1931 census, Qarawa had 89 occupied houses and population of 352, still all Muslim.

In the 1945 statistics the population was 450, all Muslims, while the total land area was 9,685 dunams, according to an official land and population survey. Of this, 105 were allocated for plantations and irrigable land, 2,820 for cereals, while 30 dunams were classified as built-up areas.

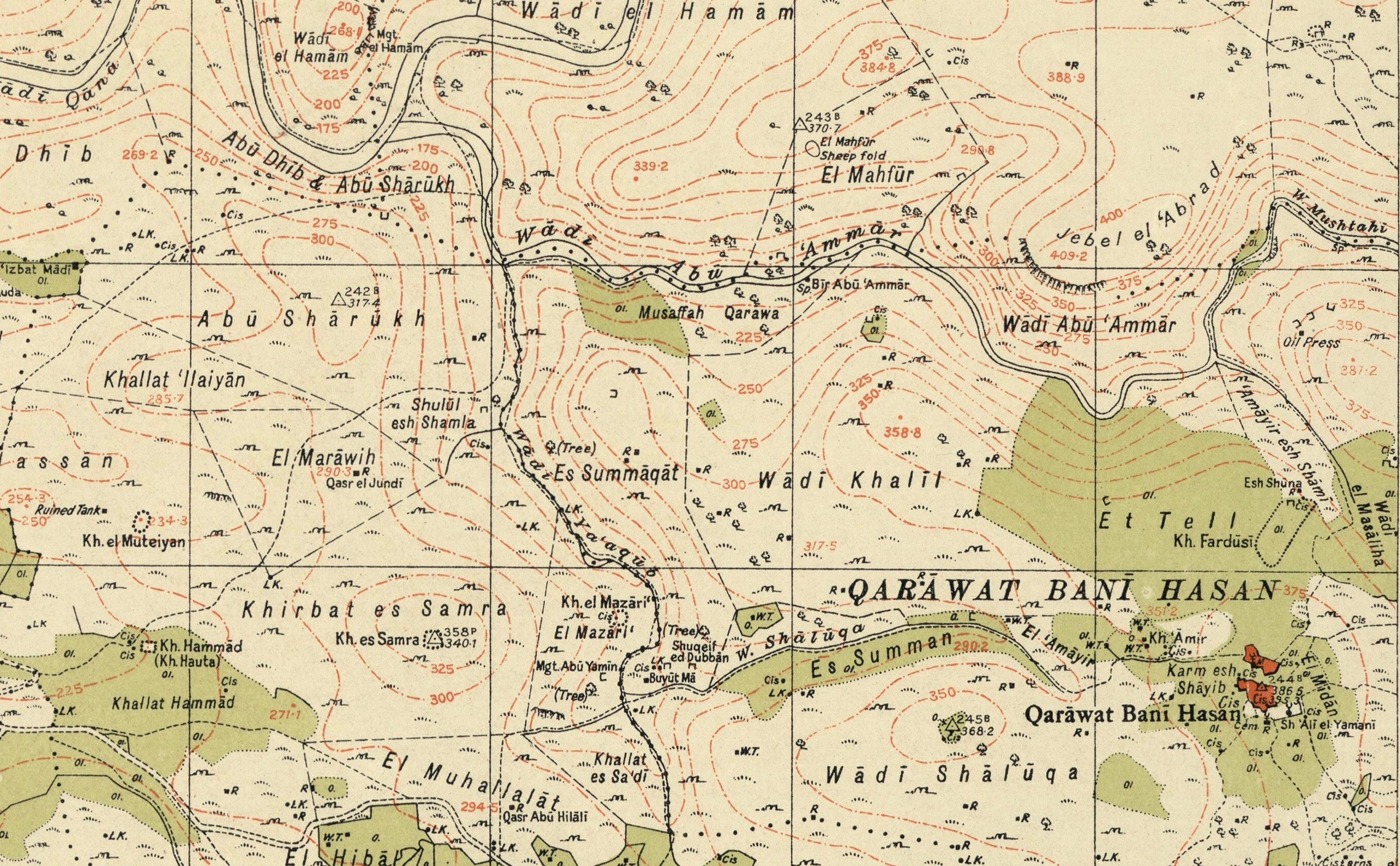
Qarawat Bani Hassan 1943 1:20,000

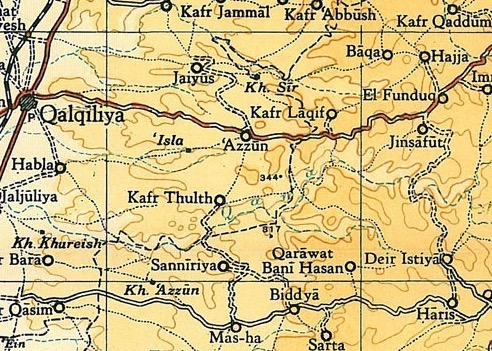
Qarawat Bani Hassan 1945 1:250,000

=== Jordanian era ===
In the wake of the 1948 Arab–Israeli War, and after the 1949 Armistice Agreements, Qarawat Bani Hassan came under Jordanian rule.

The Jordanian census of 1961 found 667 inhabitants.

=== Post-1967 ===
Since the Six-Day War in 1967, Qarawat Bani Hassan has been under Israeli occupation.

In 1986, the Israeli settlement of Kiryat Netafim was founded on land belonging to the Palestinian villages of Qarawat Bani Hassan and Haris. In November 2014 Netafim began bulldozing and clearing further Qarawat Bani Hassan territory, under the protecting of Israeli troops, in a measure apparently designed to extend the settlement.

After the 1995 accords, 9% of village land was classified as Area B in the Oslo II Accord, while the remaining 91% is Area C.

Israel has confiscated a total of 341 dunams from Qarawat Bani Hassan: 174 dunams for Kiryat Netafim and 167 dunams for Barkan.

==== Freedom Road ====
In 2010 the Prime Minister of the Palestinian National Authority Salam Fayyad visited Qarawat Bani Hassan and was told about the lack of a paved road between the village and its land. After that, the PA granted funds and the road, named "Freedom Road", was built. It was located in Area C. However, because the road was not built with Israeli approval (all construction in Area C must be coordinated with Israel), it was subsequently torn up by the Israelis in late 2010. The road was repaired by the Palestinians, but on 24 March 2011 again torn up by the Israelis.

==== Springs ====
According to a 2012 UN report two springs belonging to the village, Ein Al Majur and Ein El Nwetef, are at risk of being taken over by settlers from the nearby illegal Israeli settlement of Havat Yair.

== Demographics ==
In the 1997 census by the Palestinian Central Bureau of Statistics (PCBS), Qarawat Bani Hassan had a population of 2,703. The overwhelming majority of the population were original inhabitants, with no significant refugee population. According to the Palestinian Central Bureau of Statistics, Qarawat Bani Hassan had a population of 3,801 in the 2007 census. The gender ratio was 52.7% male and 47.3% female. There were a total 669 households and the average household had between 5–6 members.

== Economy ==
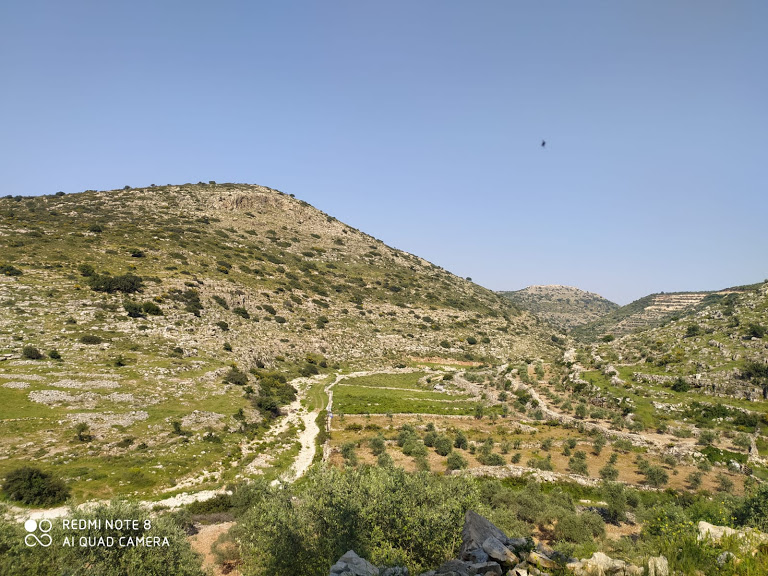
View of the Qarawat Bani Hassan, showing orchards and the surrounding hills

Prior to the Second Intifada, about 50% of the Qarawat Bani Hassan's residents of working age were employed. About 40% worked in Israel and 10% in other work inside the village. Today, 10% of the working population worked in agriculture, 10% in Israeli settlements, and 10% as traders and store merchants.

Primary agricultural products include olives, wheat, almonds, figs. Olive oil is the main product and the village produces an average of 102,000 litres of oil per year. Its inhabitants mostly export to Jordan.

== Government ==
Qarawat Bani Hassan is governed by a village council of nine members. Each three members represent one of the three families of the village: 'Asi, Mar'ai and Rayan. Local elections do not take place, but family heads select their representatives. Israel is in charge of security affairs and the Palestinian National Authority is responsible for civil affairs of the village. However, agricultural land is under the complete control of Israel.

== Bibliography ==
- Barron, J.B., ed. (1923). Palestine: Report and General Abstracts of the Census of 1922. Government of Palestine.
- Conder, C.R.; Kitchener, H.H. (1882). The Survey of Western Palestine: Memoirs of the Topography, Orography, Hydrography, and Archaeology. Vol. 2. London: Committee of the Palestine Exploration Fund.
- Dauphin, C. (1998). La Palestine byzantine, Peuplement et Populations. BAR International Series 726 (in French). Vol. III : Catalogue. Oxford: Archeopress. ISBN 0-860549-05-4.
- Finkelstein, I.; Lederman, Zvi, eds. (1997). Highlands of many cultures. Tel Aviv: Institute of Archaeology of Tel Aviv University Publications Section. ISBN 965-440-007-3.
- Government of Jordan, Department of Statistics (1964). First Census of Population and Housing. Volume I: Final Tables; General Characteristics of the Population (PDF).
- Government of Palestine, Department of Statistics (1945). Village Statistics, April, 1945.
- Guérin, V. (1875). Description Géographique Historique et Archéologique de la Palestine (in French). Vol. 2: Samarie, pt. 2. Paris: L'Imprimerie Nationale.
- Hadawi, S. (1970). Village Statistics of 1945: A Classification of Land and Area ownership in Palestine. Palestine Liberation Organization Research Center.
- Hütteroth, W.-D.; Abdulfattah, K. (1977). Historical Geography of Palestine, Transjordan and Southern Syria in the Late 16th Century. Erlanger Geographische Arbeiten, Sonderband 5. Erlangen, Germany: Vorstand der Fränkischen Geographischen Gesellschaft. ISBN 3-920405-41-2.
- Le Strange, G. (1890). Palestine Under the Moslems: A Description of Syria and the Holy Land from A.D. 650 to 1500. Committee of the Palestine Exploration Fund.
- Mills, E., ed. (1932). Census of Palestine 1931. Population of Villages, Towns and Administrative Areas. Jerusalem: Government of Palestine.
- Palmer, E.H. (1881). The Survey of Western Palestine: Arabic and English Name Lists Collected During the Survey by Lieutenants Conder and Kitchener, R. E. Transliterated and Explained by E.H. Palmer. Committee of the Palestine Exploration Fund.
- Pringle, D. (1997). Secular buildings in the Crusader Kingdom of Jerusalem: an archaeological Gazetter. Cambridge University Press. ISBN 9780521460101.
- Robinson, E.; Smith, E. (1841). Biblical Researches in Palestine, Mount Sinai and Arabia Petraea: A Journal of Travels in the year 1838. Vol. 3. Boston: Crocker & Brewster.
