= Maya households =

Ancient Mayan society was similar to other societies in regard to their social classes. The two main categories in society were the elite class and the commoner class. The elites had control over every city's politics and religion; however, the vast majority of the population fell into the commoners category. The Maya lived in houses surrounded by extended family. The type of house that an individual had depended largely on how much power they had. The elites had houses that were larger and made of longer-lasting material than the commoners. The quality and quantity of items inside a person's house also depended on status in their society.

== Households ==
The households in Maya civilization consisted of extended families living near each other and sharing common spaces. The nuclear family each had personal homes. The shared areas would sometimes include a garden, kitchen area, storage area, and manufacturing area. The amount of shared buildings in a household depended on how many families were living there, how large the nuclear homes were, and what the occupations of that family included.

Women spent the majority of time at the house with children, while the men had to go hunting and provide for the family. The women were in charge of gardening and would teach their daughters as they grew older. When a young man was old enough to marry he would leave his parents' house. He would then build a new house near his father's house and once he had a wife they would live there together and raise children.

The shape of the houses was the same for both main classes. The differences were the size of the houses and the materials used to build the houses. They would either be oblong or rectangular in shape.

Every house contained some type of pottery. The ancient Maya used pottery for cooking, eating, and storing water. The pottery of the commoners was less elaborate than that of the elite. The elite had pottery for household tasks but they also had pottery for decoration and art. The items inside the royal homes were yet another way for them to show power and wealth.

The houses consist of mud and stone walls with thatched roofs. The houses also have straw to protect them from things such as rain and snow. The Ancient Maya houses have not changed for well over a thousand years.

== The Commoner houses ==
The commoners made up the majority of the population and included skilled craftsmen. The individual homes of the commoners were occupied by nuclear families. This included parents and their children.

Since the commoners did not have the power and prestige that the elites had, their houses were usually made out of perishable goods. They would use trees, mud, and grass to construct their homes. They would pack mud onto the walls to keep out rainfall and for temperature control. They would cover the top of the house with grass or tree branches to try to prevent rain from entering the house. If the house had a hearth in it there was a danger of fire since most of the material used to build the house was not fire resistant. Sometimes the house would have a stone foundation, but it was rare. The house was usually one big room, sometimes separated by a wall. It was common for the families to decorate the wall in the front of their house by using lime to make it whiter. The sleeping area was in the back of the house and the front of the house had the door, facing east, and sometimes a porch area.

The family would sleep in the same room. The beds were made out of sapling rods and a mat was placed on top. They would use cloths made out of cotton for a blanket to keep warm at night. The commoner's houses had to be remodeled often because of the materials used to build them.

When a relative died they would usually bury them either under the relatives' floor or near the house. This is one of the reasons that there is less knowledge about the commoners than there is about the elites.

== Elite houses ==
The elite people in the Maya society held political power. They were the kings and royalty of the cities. Because they had more power than the commoners they lived in the center of the city.

Since lineage was so important to the Maya people, the nobles also lived in the same location as their extended families. The kingship was inherited so in order to be royalty one had to be either born into the family or marry into the family.

The people that were considered elite had to show their power and show that they held higher standings than the commoners. They did this by building larger homes than the majority of society and by using better materials to do so. Using high quality materials ensured the longevity of their house. One way to prevent damage was using vaulted masonry, it was harder for enemies to destroy and harder for accidental fires to burn down the structure. The structure was made with non-perishable items including stone for the walls and roof. Their houses were also unique from the commoners in that their structures were built on higher platforms, instead of smaller dirt mounds. The elite had more resources for burying their relatives. Instead of burying a relative under the house or near the house with no protection, they were buried inside of temples.
