= Raphaël Savignac =

French archaeologist and photographer (1874–1951)

- Born: July 21, 1874; Sanilhac, Ardèche
- Died: November 27, 1951; Bethlehem
- Occupations: Archaeologist, photographer, Catholic priest

Antoine Raphaël Savignac (born July 21, 1874, in Cajarc – died on November 27, 1951, in Bethlehem) was a French archaeologist and photographer.

Photography by Raphaël Savignac
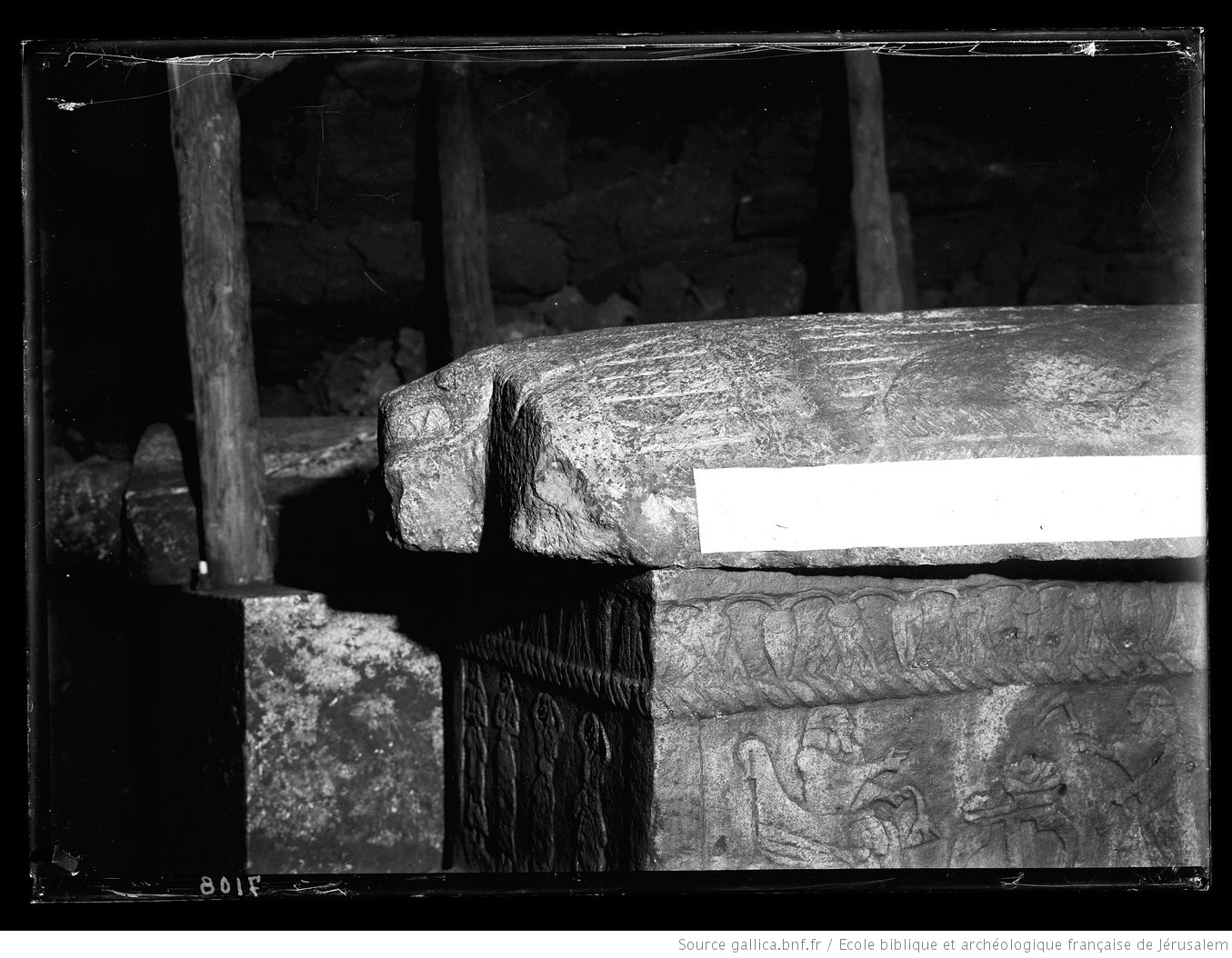
Discovery of the Ahiram Sarcophagus

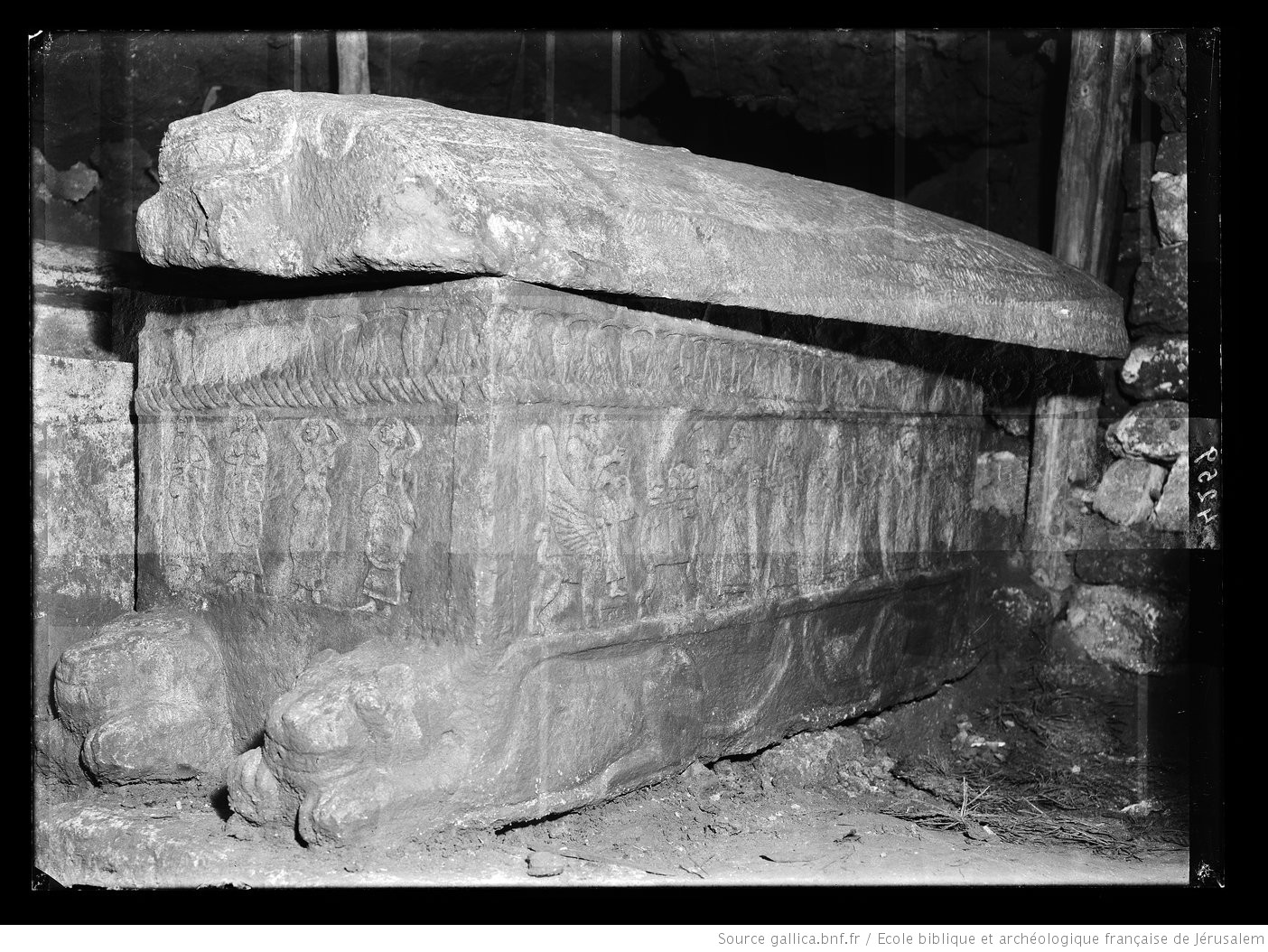
Discovery of the Ahiram Sarcophagus

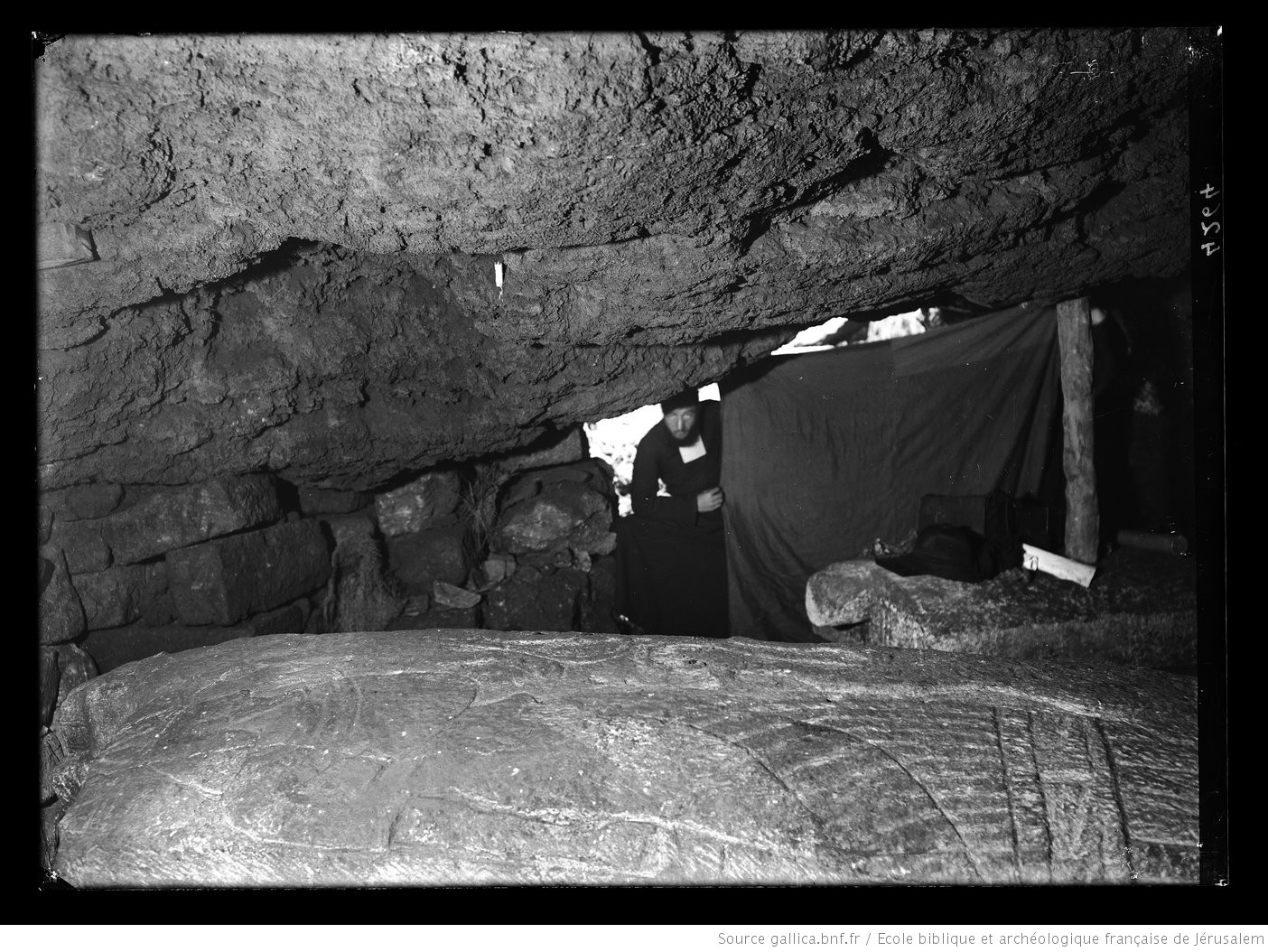
Discovery of the Ahiram Sarcophagus

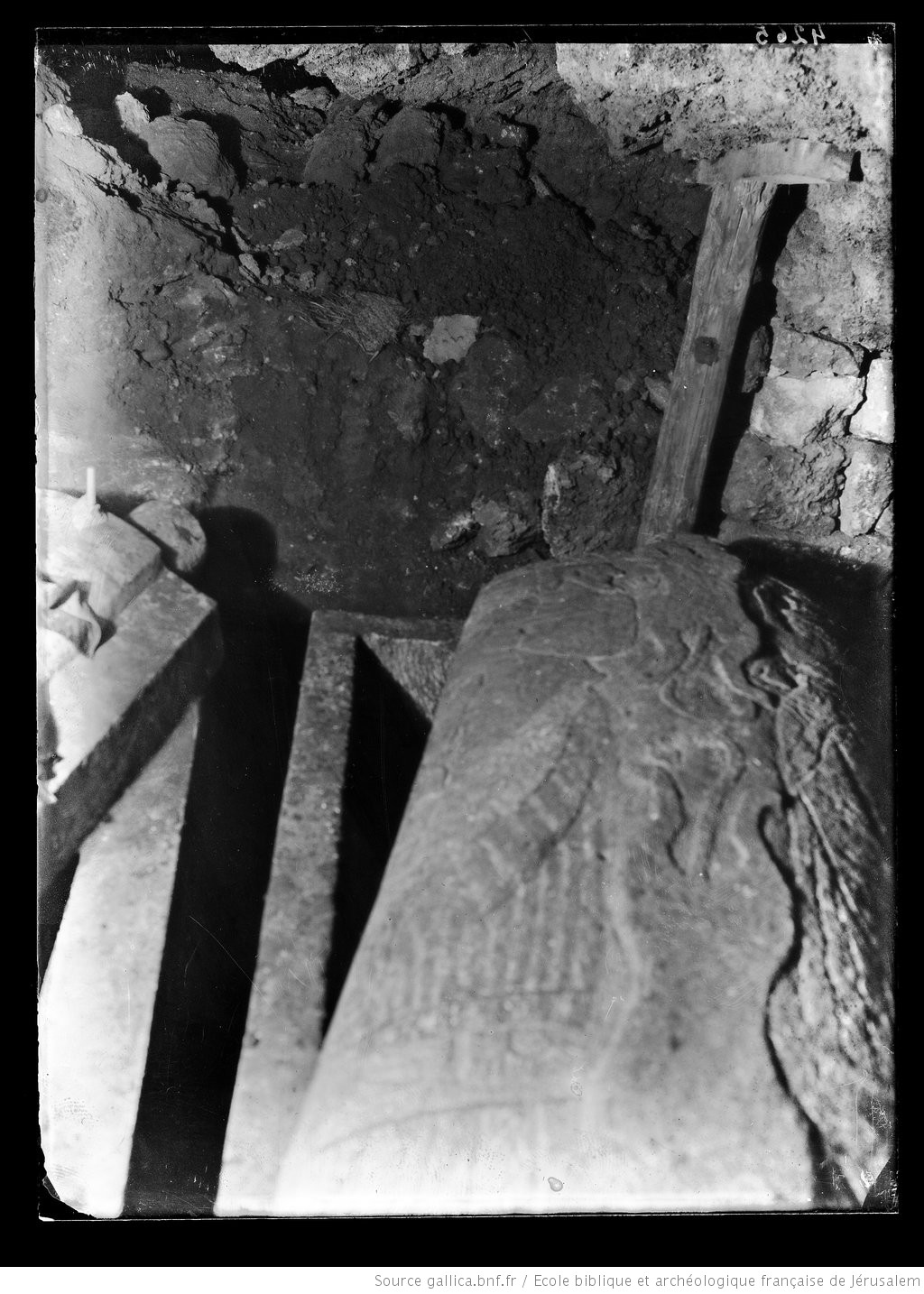
Discovery of the Ahiram Sarcophagus

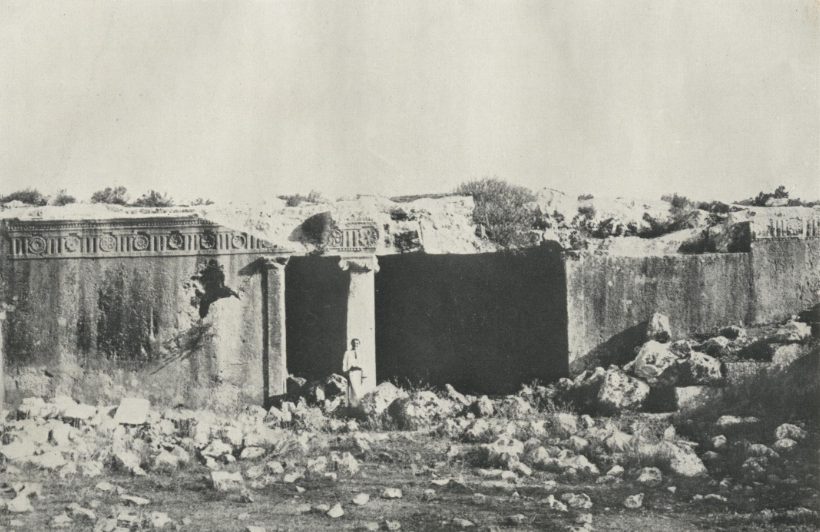
Deir ed-Darb
