= Distyle in antis =

Classical architecture temple structure

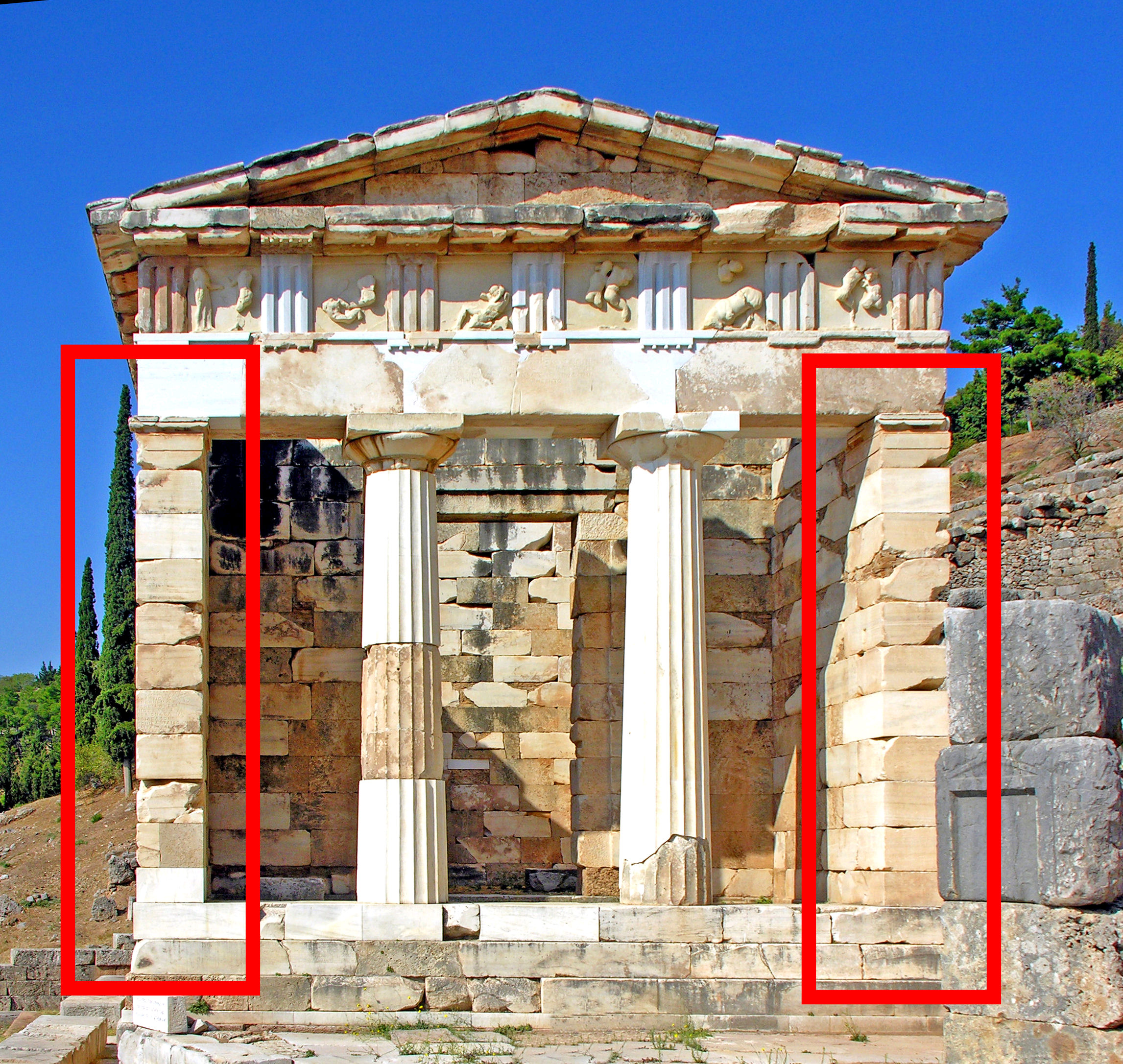
The Athenian Treasury in Delphi has a typical distyle in antis design, with two antae framing two columns.

In classical architecture, distyle in antis denotes a temple with the side walls extending to the front of the porch and terminating with two antae, the pediment being supported by two columns or sometimes caryatids. This is the earliest type of temple structure in the ancient Greek world. An example is the Siphnian Treasury in Delphi, built around 525 BCE.

Smaller two-column structures without antae are called distyle. The next evolution in temple design came with amphiprostyle, where four columns stand in line on the porch in front of a naos.

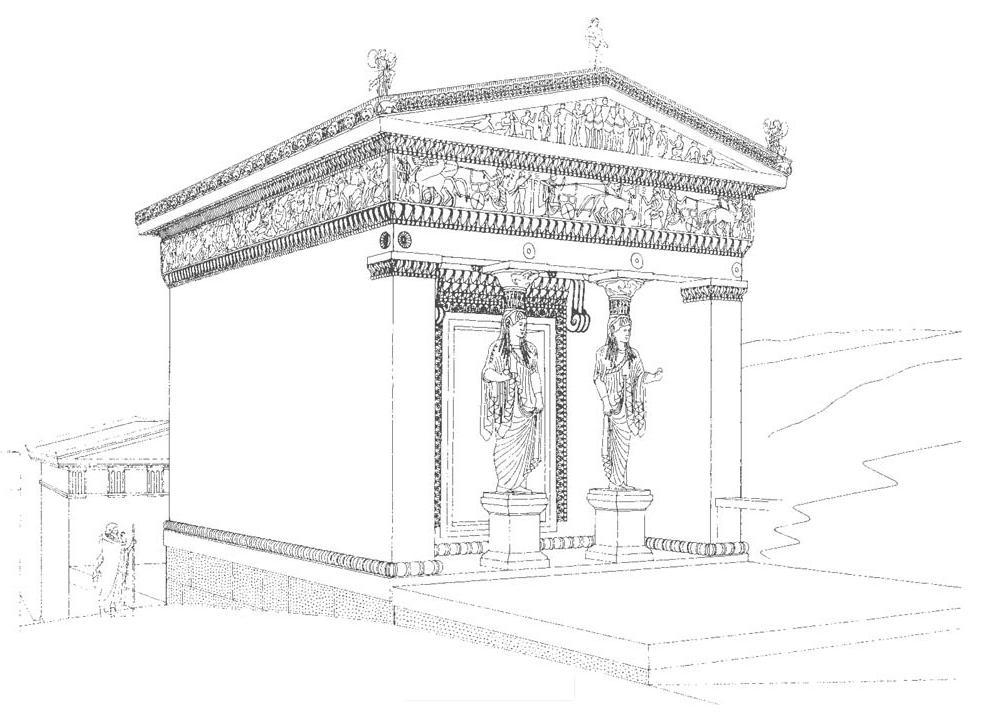
Reconstruction of the Siphnian Treasury

Types of temple plan

== Rock-cut tombs ==
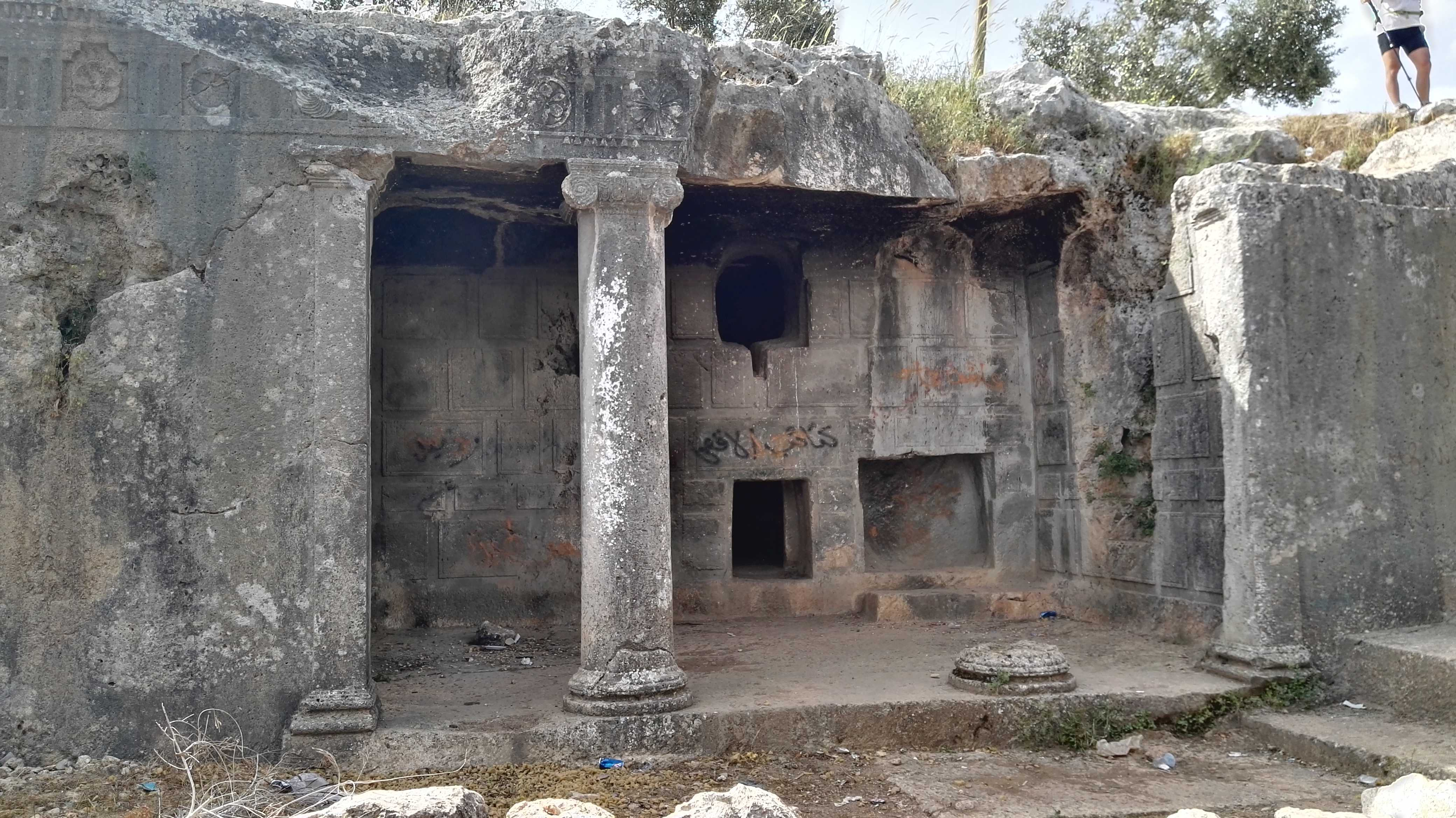
Deir ed-Darb, monumental tomb from 1st-century BCE Judea with a distyle in antis façade (one column missing)

The distyle in antis design is characteristic of rock-cut tombs from Second Temple-period Judea, found not only in Jerusalem but also at rural sites such as Deir ed-Darb, Khirbet Kurkush, Mokata 'Abud, Khirbet Tibnah, Khirbet Simiya, and others.

== See also ==
- Antae temple
- Prostyle
