= Deir ed-Darb =

Ancient rock-cut tomb in the northern West Bank

- دير الدرب (Arabic)
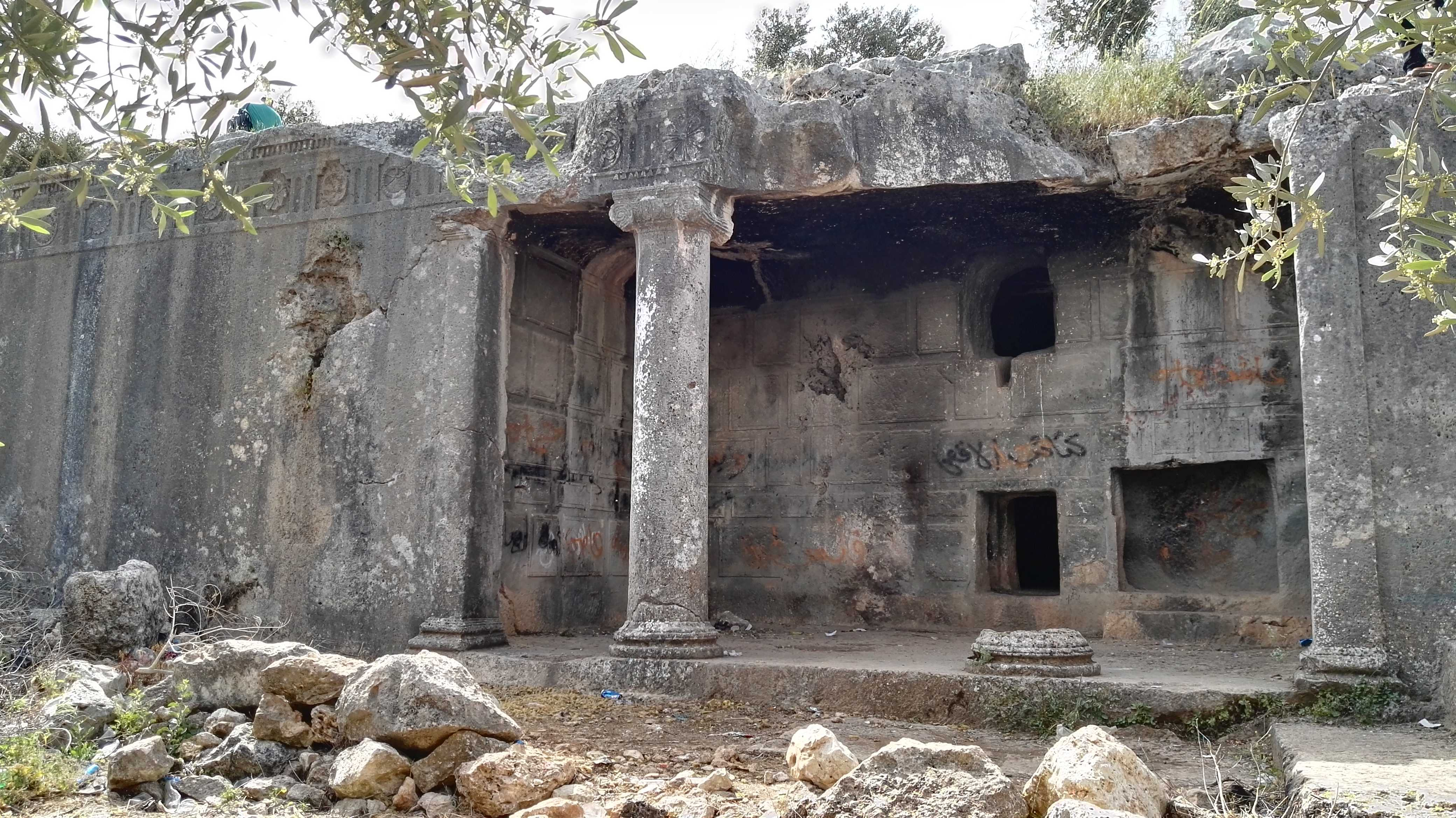

- Location within the West Bank
- 32°07′28″N 35°06′21″E
- Type: rock-cut tomb
- Periods: Hellenistic, Roman periods
- Cultures: Second Temple Judaism
- Location: Qarawat Bani Hassan, West Bank
- Region: Samaria
- Palestine grid: 160/170

History
- Built: 1st century BCE

Site notes
- Excavation dates: 1972, 1978
- Archaeologists: Ze'ev Yeivin, Ibrahim al-Fani, Shimon Dar, Yitzhak Magen, Dvir Raviv
- Condition: In ruins

Deir ed-Darb (Arabic: دير الدرب, lit. 'The monastery of the road') is a monumental rock-cut tomb in the village of Qarawat Bani Hassan in the West Bank. The tomb displays architectural elements typical of late Second Temple Judea, with notable similarities to tombs from the same period in Jerusalem; based on these features, scholars date it to the 1st century BCE. The site was investigated by archaeologists in the 1970s.

== Location ==
Deir ed-Darb is located approximately 40 km southwest of Nablus. From the Hasmonean period, and up until the Bar Kokhba Revolt (132–136 CE), the surrounding area was inhabited by a Jewish population.

== Description ==
=== Main tomb ===
The tomb at Deir ed-Darb features a distyle in antis façade, consisting of two Ionic columns positioned between projecting antae—of which only one survives. These columns support a Doric frieze, whose metopes are adorned with rosette motifs—a decorative element common during the Second Temple period. The frieze continues on both sides beyond the antae and is not supported by carved pilasters, indicating a decorative rather than structural function.

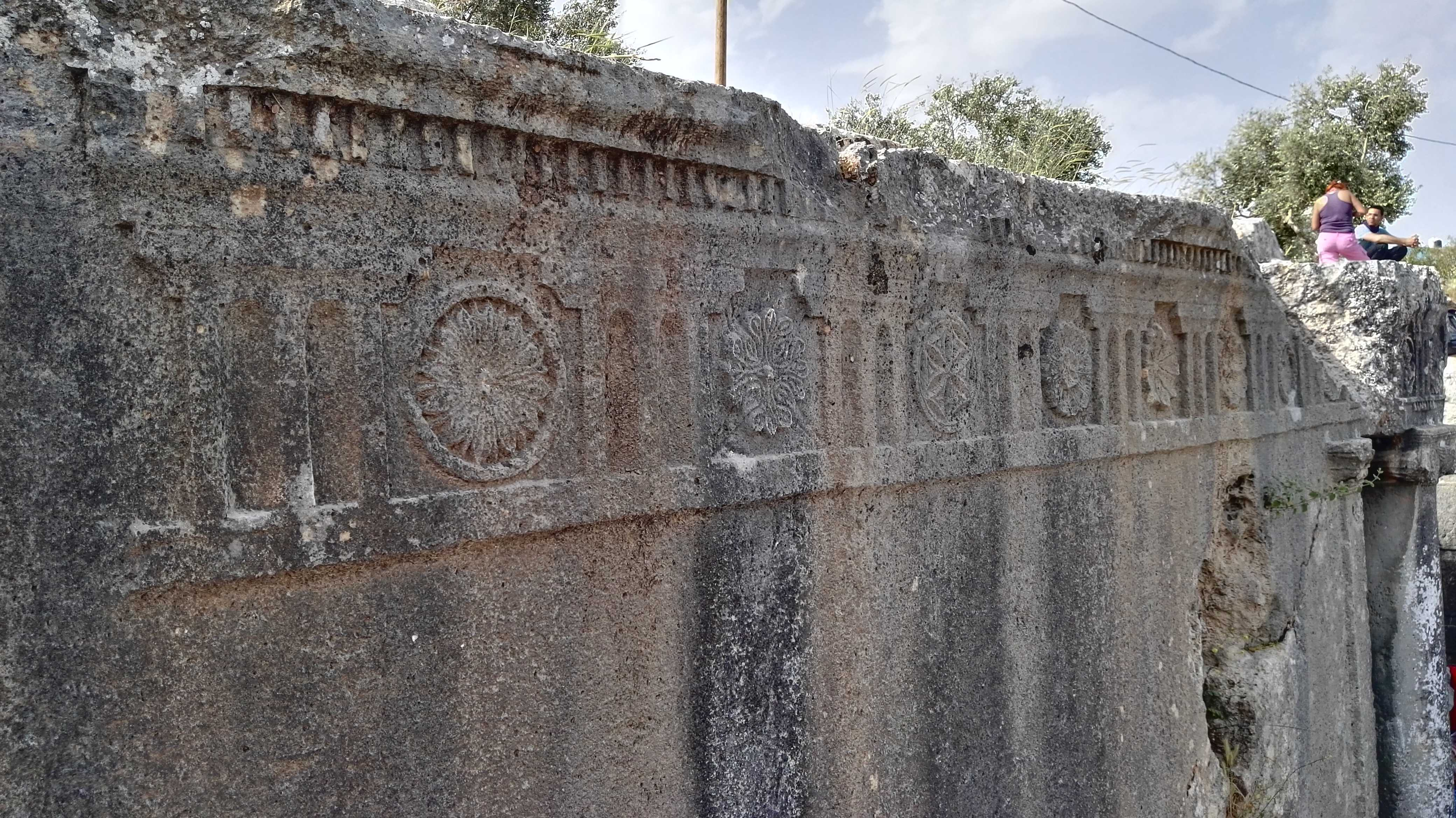
The frieze, featuring metopes adorned with rosette motifs alongside triglyphs

The façade, entirely hewn from the natural rock, faces onto a courtyard measuring approximately 15 by 20 meters, which has been cut into the rock in front of the hypogeum. Within the hypogeum are three carefully masoned burial chambers and an antechamber. The interior walls of the entrance hall are carved with 'imitation' courses of ashlars. These are rendered with drafted margins.

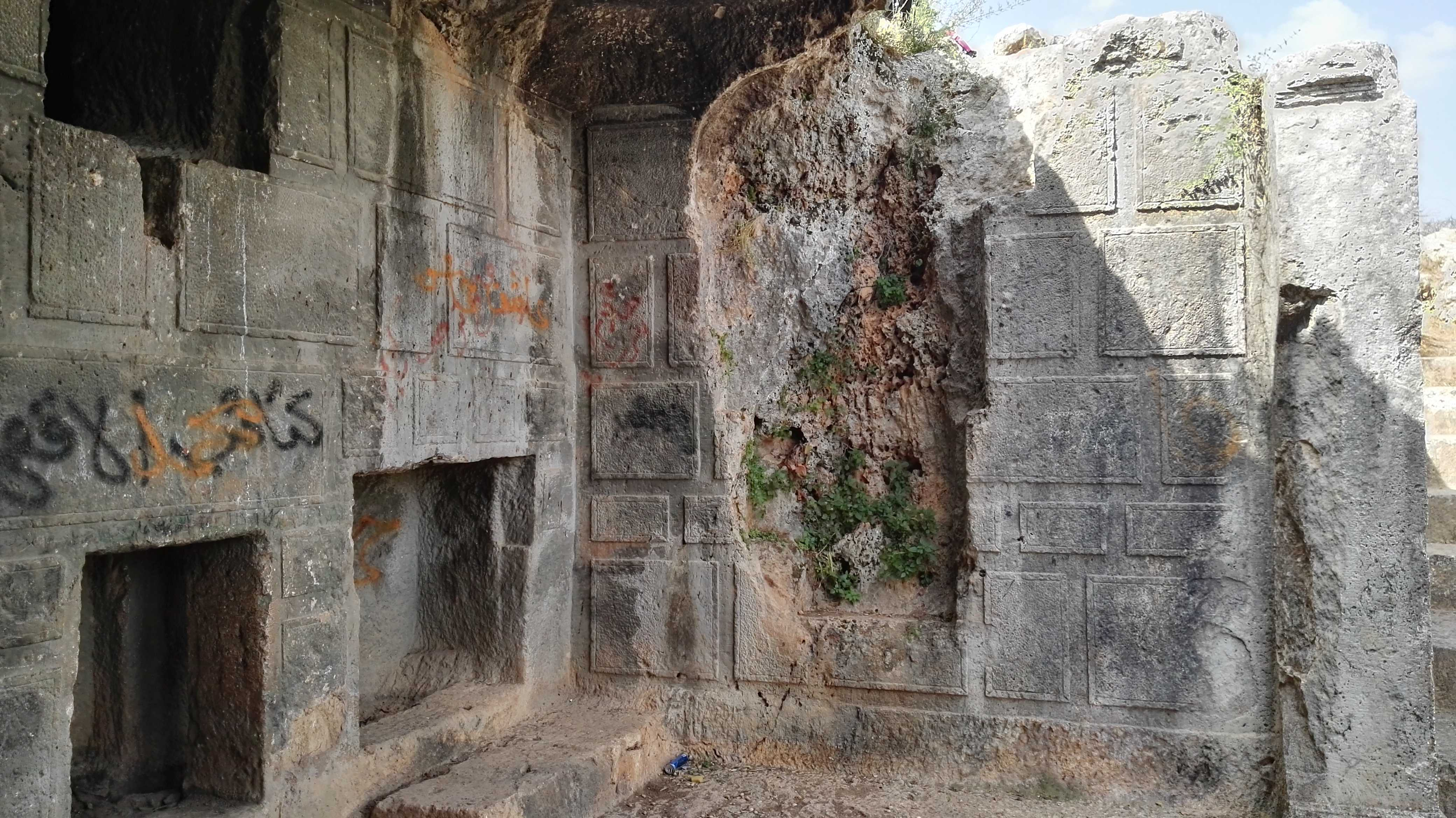
Interior walls of the entrance hall carved with ashlar courses

=== Nearby tombs ===
In addition to the main tomb at Deir ed-Darb, the area includes other rock-cut tombs with ornamental façades, many now largely buried beneath erosion soil. A second necropolis appears to have been developing approximately one kilometer to the west.

A 1978 excavation of a nearby kokh tomb, situated about 100 meters west of the main tomb, revealed continuous use from the late Second Temple period through the fourth century CE, as evidenced by Herodian pottery, Roman glassware, and Samaritan-style lamps decorated with menorah motifs. These finds suggest the presence of a Samaritan community in the area, possibly connected to a synagogue once believed to have existed at Qarawat Bani Hassan. Burial activity appears to have ceased by the Byzantine period, perhaps due to regional upheavals in the aftermath of the Samaritan revolts, or changing local practices.

== Dating and identification ==
Scholars date the tomb at Deir ed-Darb to the late 1st century BCE, based on architectural parallels with Jewish tombs of the same period in Jerusalem. Its design, including its distyle in antis façade, closely resembles that of Umm el-'Amed, a rock-cut tomb in Jerusalem from the Herodian era, suggesting a shared stylistic and chronological context characteristic of late Second Temple Judea.

Archaeologist Shimon Dar has proposed that the tomb at Deir ed-Darb may have belonged to Ptolemy of Rhodes, a senior minister in the court of Herod the Great. According to Josephus, Ptolemy owned an estate in the village of Arous in Samaria, which has been identified with the present-day village of Kifl Haris, located approximately 4 kilometers east of Deir ed-Darb. Dar also cites the nearby site of Qal'at Firdus (Arabic for "Herod's citadel")—a structure exhibiting similar stylistic features and constructed with Herodian masonry within Qarawat Bani Hassan—as further evidence that this area may have formed part of Ptolemy's holdings. Josephus records that the village of Arous was destroyed by Arab troops in Varus's army following Herod's death around 4 BCE, possibly providing a terminus ante quem (the latest possible date) for the construction of the tomb.

Shimon Dar suggests that the tomb was abandoned after the First Jewish Revolt (66–73 CE) and remained unused until it was reoccupied by pagan groups in the second to third centuries CE, at which point a statue niche was added in the antechamber.

== Research history ==
One of the earliest scientific records of the site appears in the Survey of Western Palestine conducted by the Palestine Exploration Fund (PEF), which documents a visit on 29 May 1873. The site was reportedly discovered by Sergeant Black of the Royal Engineers. The PEF described the tomb as "one of the finest sepulchral monuments in the country," noting its resemblance to Second Temple-era tombs near Jerusalem, including the first-century CE "Tomb of Helena", Umm el-'Amed, and the so-called "Retreat of the Apostles."

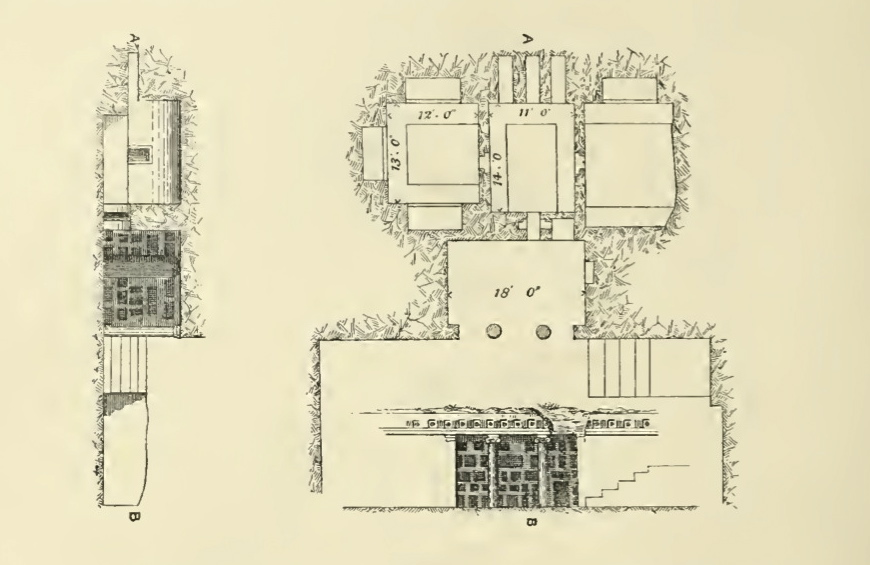
Section through Deir ed Derb, 1873

The site was visited in August 1909 by a group of professors and students from the École Biblique. In a report published the following year, Raphaël Savignac noted that the tomb appeared to have been better preserved at the time of the PEF's survey than in his own day. The work aimed to supplement the PEF's earlier account and document decorative details he considered at risk of disappearing. By the time of Savignac's visit, one of the two Ionic columns supporting the atrium ceiling (documented intact by the PEF in 1873) had been broken, apparently by a blasting charge.

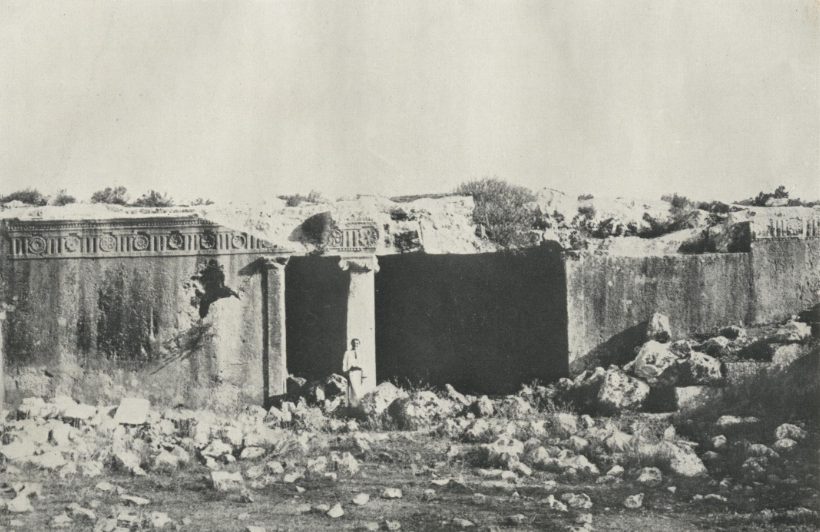
Façade (photo by Raphaël Savignac, published 1910)

Archaeological work at the site was carried out in 1972 by Ze'ev Yeivin and Ibrahim al-Fani (cleaning the main tomb), and again in 1978 by Shimon Dar. Under international law an occupying power is not permitted to carry out archaeological excavations except to preserve or rescue a site.

== See also ==
- Tomb of Absalom
- Tombs of the Kings
- Tomb of Zechariah
- Khirbat al-Simia
- Khirbet Kurkush
- Umm al-Amad, Jerusalem

== Bibliography ==
- Conder, Claude Reignier; Kitchener, Herbert (1882). The Survey of Western Palestine: Memoirs of the Topography, Orography, Hydrography and Archaeology. Vol. II. London: Committee of the Palestine Exploration Fund. pp. 313–315.
- Dar, Shimon (1986). Landscape and Pattern: An Archaeological Survey of Samaria 800 BCE–636 CE. B.A.R. International Series. Vol. 308. Oxford. pp. 234–235.
- Greenberg, Raphael; Keinan, Adi (2009). Israeli Archaeological Activity in the West Bank 1967–2007: A Sourcebook (PDF). Ostracon. p. 47.
- Palmer, Edward Henry (1881). The Survey of Western Palestine: Arabic and English Name Lists. London: Committee of the Palestine Exploration Fund. p. 228.
- Peleg-Barkat, Orit (2012). "The relative chronology of tomb façades in Early Roman Jerusalem and power displays by the élite". Journal of Roman Archaeology. 25: 403–418. doi:10.1017/S1047759400001276.
- Peleg-Barkat, Orit (2023). "What have the Romans ever done for us? Early Roman Jerusalem as an urban centre between local tradition and Roman rule". Architectures of the Roman World: Models, Agency, Reception. Oxbow Books. doi:10.2307/jj.7657701.14. ISBN 978-1-78925-994-0.
- Raviv, Dvir; Zissu, Boaz (2020). "Tombs with Decorated Façades in the Judean Countryside". Zeitschrift des Deutschen Palästina-Vereins. 136 (2): 152–175. ISSN 0012-1169. JSTOR 45381827.
- Savignac, Raphaël (1910). "Visite aux fouilles de Samarie. À travers les nécropoles de la montagne d'Éphraïm". Revue Biblique. Nouvelle Série. 7 (1): 113–128. JSTOR 44102543.
- Stahl, Ziv (2017), Appropriating the Past Israel's Archaeological Practices in the West Bank (PDF), Emek Shaveh and Yesh Din
