= Khirbet Kurkush =

Archeological site in the State of Palestine

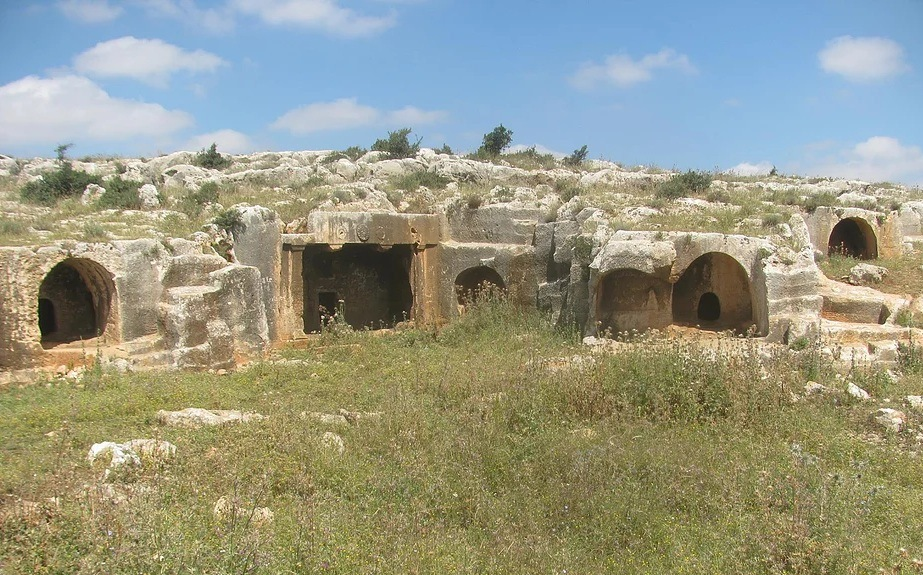
- Ancient necropolis

- Location within State of Palestine
- 32°05′16″N 35°06′54″E
- Type: settlement, necropolis
- Periods: Hellenistic to Byzantine period
- Cultures: Samaritan or Jewish
- Location: State of Palestine
- Grid position: 161/166 PAL

Site notes
- Height: 442 m (1,450 ft)
- Area: 14 acres (5.7 ha)
- Excavation dates: 1991
- Archaeologists: Shimon Riklin, Yitzhak Magen, Dvir Raviv
- Condition: In ruins
- Public access: yes

Khirbet Kurkush (Arabic: خربة قرقش) is an archeological site in the West Bank. It lies between the Israeli settlements of Bruchin and Ariel and near the Palestinian town of Bruqin, in the Salfit Governorate of the State of Palestine.

The site was inhabited mostly during the Hellenistic, Roman, and Byzantine periods, from which impressive remnants of structures and quarries still survive. However, there have been findings from earlier times, such as the Iron Age, as well as later ones, such as the Middle Ages. There are several nearby rock-cut tombs, some of which are lavishly decorated, that resemble similar Jewish tombs of Jerusalem during the late Second Temple period. Archeologists disagree on whether Jews, Samaritans, or pagan groups used this necropolis and other nearby similar sites in western Samaria. Nonetheless, the majority of archaeologists believe the site to be a Jewish necropolis constructed for the rural Jewish elites of the area, possibly by Jewish craftsmen who fled Jerusalem prior to its siege and destruction in 70 CE.

== Surveys and excavations ==
In 1870, the site was visited by Victor Guérin, who described it as a ruined Arab village covered with brushwood, and noted a few ancient cisterns in its vicinity. Guérin most likely didn't notice the surrounding necropolis, which the Palestine Exploration Fund (PEF) surveyed three years later. PEF described the site as "a ruined village with a fine cemetery of rock-cut tombs, and traces of ruins. A large birkeh, or tank, and extensive quarries also exist, with two sarcophagi cut in the rock, and still attached to it. [...] Six tombs were here planned [...]", and included an in-depth account of the necropolis, including a few diagrams.

The site was surveyed again by the École Biblique, and after the 1967 Six-Day War, it was surveyed by Yosef Porat as part of the "Emergency Survey" (1968), and in additional surveys conducted by Shimon Dar (1982), Israel Finkelstein (also 1980s), Yitzhak Magen (2002) and Dvir Raviv (2013).

In 1983, Finkelstein and Lederman's team surveyed Khirbet Kurkush, finding pottery dating from the Iron Age to the Ottoman era. They described it as featuring remnants of buildings, some with intact vaults, along with quarries and elaborately decorated Hellenistic/Roman tombs, including an impressive "rock-cut 'courtyard' with decorated facades of rock-cut tombs".

A salvage excavation was carried out at the site in 1991 by Shimon Riklin, on behalf of the Staff Officer for Archaeology of the Civil Administration of Judea and Samaria.

== Necropolis ==
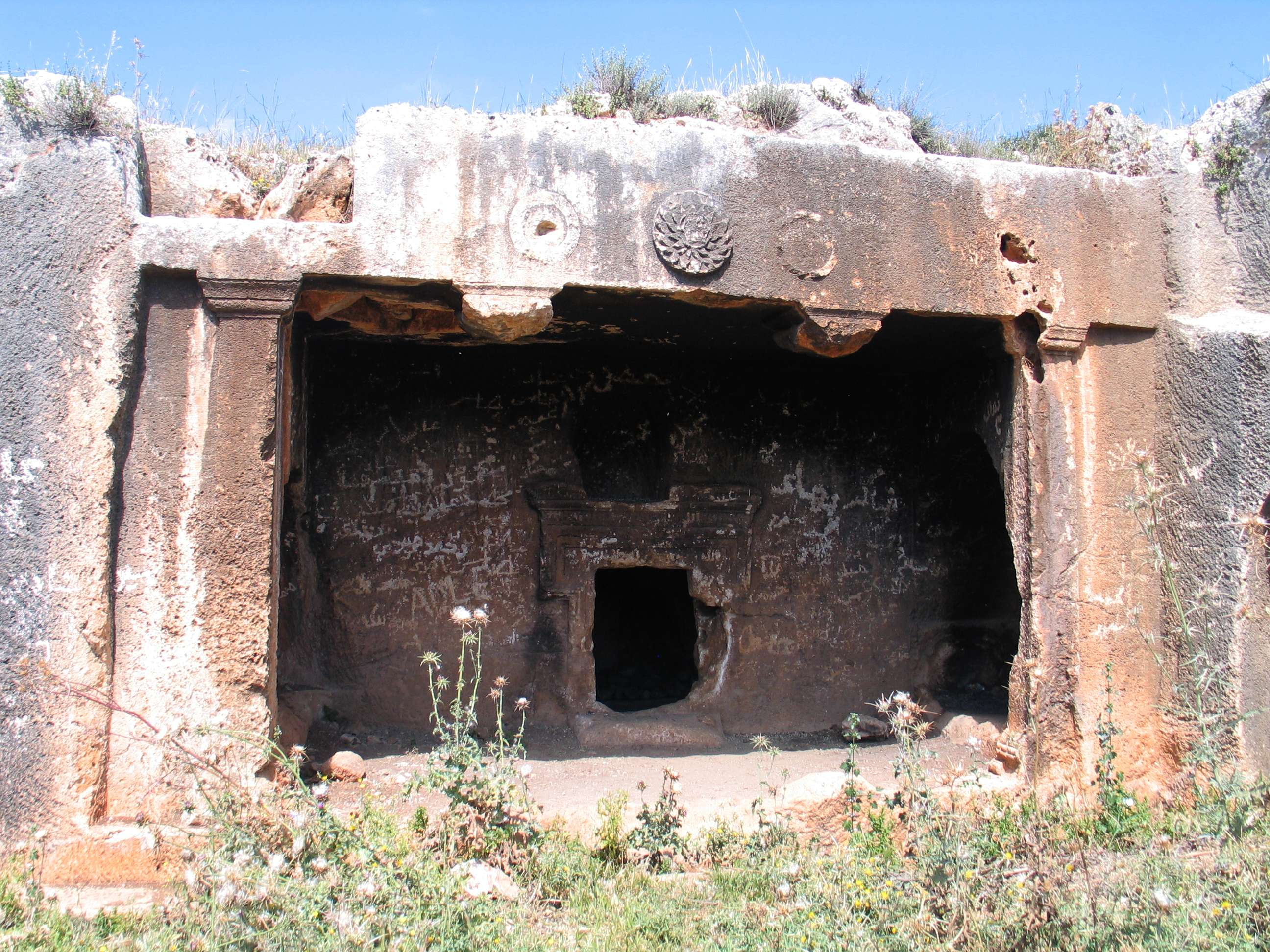
The central tomb, showing the distyle in antis style and the decorated frieze

About 200 meters to the east of the ruins, in a quarry that was probably used to build the settlement's houses, a necropolis was found, where 18 burial caves with kokhim are visible, with a number of open-air trough tombs carved between them.

The central tomb, which was part of a vast quarry and was hewn out of rock in the northern portion of a courtyard, attracted the bulk of scholarly interest. Two antae, coupled with columns of the Ionic order, made up its porch (distyle in antis); these columns are no longer standing and were probably robbed long ago. The frieze that hangs over the tomb's porch features a rosette relief cut out in the middle, that is flanked by two damaged wreath reliefs. The decorations here are reminiscent of the lavish tombs from Jerusalem's late Second Temple period.

The rest of the tombs, which are simpler, are made in a fairly uniform format - an entrance room with a barrel vault, an opening that was blocked with a rolling stone, and a burial chamber with a central standing pit around which large niches are carved, with their own rolling stones. A number of these tombs have architectural decorations, such as a quarry that simulates hewn smooth stones with chiseled edges or columns with Doric capitals. A row of stones in the Herodian style was another intriguing discovery.

== Debate over the site's culture ==
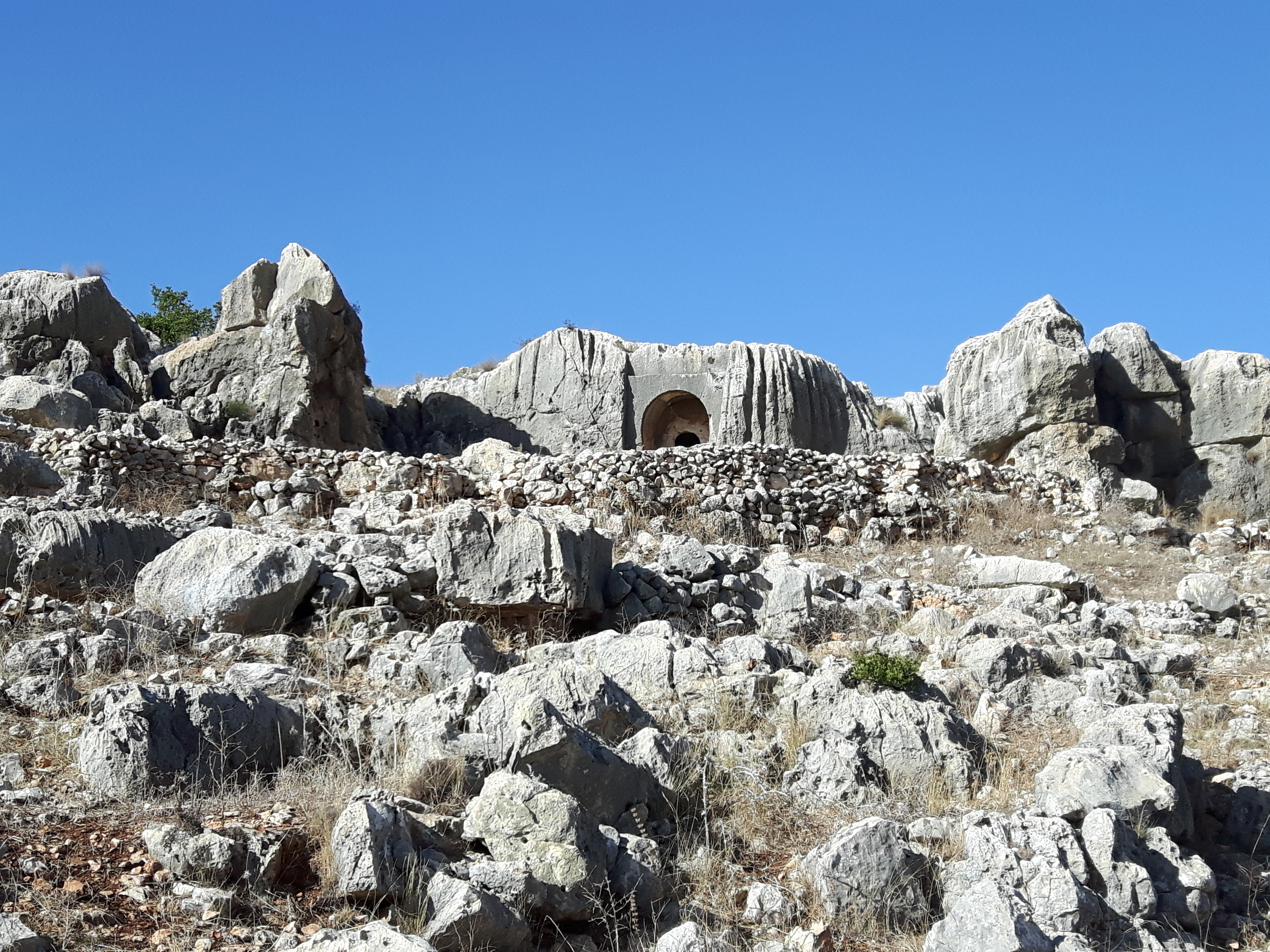
A view of one of the ancient tombs

The majority of site researchers preferred to assume that the site's inhabitants were Jews, with Magen and Ricklin being the exceptions, who suggested that the site was inhabited by Samaritans or possibly pagan populations.

Magen postulated that the area's residents were Samaritan or pagans and that Jerusalemite artisans employed by the locals were responsible for giving the burial cave decorations their distinctively Jewish appearance. Riklin, who unearthed remnants of quarries, a winepress, a few structures, and several towers from the Roman and Byzantine periods close to the site during a salvage excavation, suggested attributing the towers to the Samaritan population. Magen proposed that the elaborate tombs in western Samaria, including Khirbet Kurkush, may have been built for the local population by Jewish craftsmen who fled to Samaria when the Roman siege of Jerusalem of 70 CE began. Peleg-Barkat preferred to draw the conclusion that this site and the other similar elaborately decorated funerary complexes in Samaria were built by local Jewish elites who took inspiration from the magnificent tombs of the Jewish nobility of Jerusalem.

Raviv and other archeologists concluded that the Khirbet Kurkush necropolis, along with other similar sites in western Samaria, is to be associated with wealthy Jewish families who lived in the area during the late Second Temple Period. They based this on the similarity of the necropolis' architecture and ornamentation to Jewish tombs in Jerusalem as well as the area's position as a buffer between a Samaritan-majority area and a Jewish-majority area. The discovery of an underground hideout complex close to the nearby Palestinian village of 'Aboud, which is filled with findings brought by Jewish refugees during the Bar Kokhba revolt, as well as the fact that the nearby site of Khirbet Tibneh, which has been identified as ancient Thamna, served as the capital of a toparchy in Judaea during the same period, are evidence of the presence of Jews in this part of western Samaria.

== See also ==
=== Similar sites ===
- Mokata 'Abud
- Deir ed-Derb
- Tombs of the Kings
- Umm al-Amad, Jerusalem
- Jason's Tomb
- Tomb of Benei Hezir
