= Drafted masonry =

Drafted masonry, in architecture, is the term given to large stones, the face of which has been dressed round the edge in a draft or sunken surface, leaving the centre portion as it came from the quarry. The dressing is worked with an adze of eight teeth to the inch, used in a vertical direction and to a width of two to four inches.

The earliest example of drafted masonry is found in the immense platform built by Cyrus in 530 BC at Pasargadae in Persia. It occurs again in the palace of Hyrcanus, known as the Arak-el-Emir (176 BC), but is there inferior in execution.

The finest drafted masonry is that dating from the time of Herod the Great, in the tower of David and the walls of the Haram in Jerusalem, and at Hebron. In the castles built by the Crusaders, the adze has been worked in a diagonal direction instead of vertically. In all these examples the size of the stones employed is sometimes enormous, so that the traditional influence of the Phoenician stonemasons seems to have lasted till the twelfth century.
