= Khirbat al-Simia =

- Municipality type D (Village council)

Arabic transcription(s)
  - Arabic: خربة السيميا
  - Latin: Khirbat al-Simia (official)
- Location of Khirbat al-Simia within Palestine
- Coordinates: 31°25′18″N 35°02′01″E
- Palestine grid: 153/92
- State: State of Palestine
- Governorate: Hebron

Government
  - Type: Village council

Population (2006)
  - Total: 1,705
- Name meaning: The mark, or sign

Khirbat al-Simia (Arabic: خربة السيميا) is a Palestinian village located four kilometers north-west of As-Samu .The village is in the Hebron Governorate Southern West Bank. According to the Palestinian Central Bureau of Statistics, the village had a population of 1,705 in mid-year 2006.

== History ==
It has been suggested that Khirbat al-Simia was identical to a Biblical place named Eshean.

=== Ottoman era ===
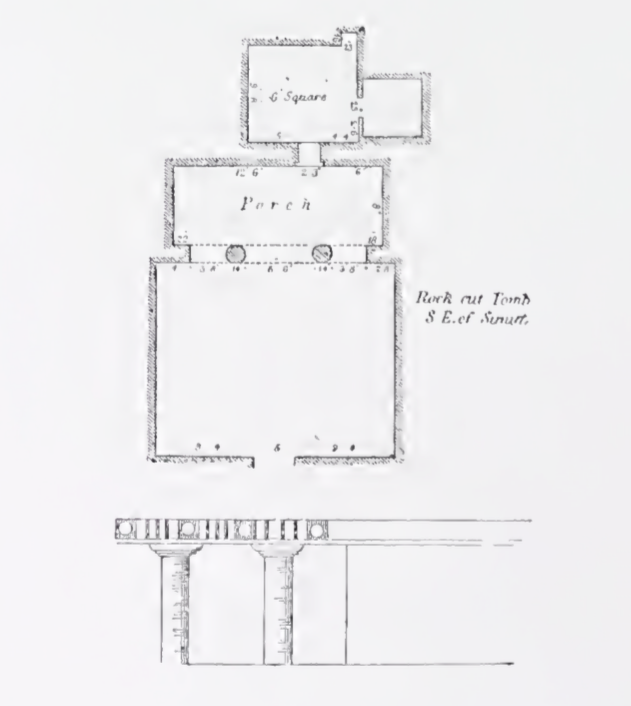
Diagram of tomb south-east of Khirbat al-Simia, as drawn by SWP

Khirbat al-Simia was incorporated into the Ottoman Empire in 1517, and in the census of 1596 the village appeared under the name Simya Burin (Abu Hasan), being in the Nahiya of Halil of the Liwa of Quds. It had a population of 18 households, all Muslim. They paid a fixed tax-rate of 33,3% on agricultural products, including wheat, barley, summer crops, vineyards and fruit trees, goats and bee-hives, in addition to occasional revenues; a total of 1,600 Akçe.

In 1838, Simieh was noted by Edward Robinson as a place "in ruins or deserted," part of the area south-west of Hebron.

In 1863, Victor Guérin noted: "The highest point of this mound is occupied by the debris of a small fort, the lower courses of which, still standing, are composed of enormous blocks cut in bosses.

Lower down I notice the location of a building which, except for a fine section of wall of very regular stones, is upset from top to bottom. Two tombs of broken stone columns lie on the ground in the interior. Perhaps, in the Christian era, this edifice served as a church. As for the houses, there was scarcely anything left, except for the cisterns and caves dug in the rock which a number of them contained. I also observe a small birket about ten · paces by four wide; it is partly built and partly dug in the rock.

A short distance to the east of this hill, on the last slopes of a mountain, is a magnificent tomb, which is preceded by a small courtyard, cut in the bright rod, which measures eight steps in length by six and half wide. From there one enters into an open vestibule, decorated externally with two pilasters and two Doric columns, arranged in the thickness of the rock, and whose frieze consists of denoted metopes and triglyphs. This vestibule is, on the inside, seven paces long and three and a half wide. A very low bay in the center allows one to penetrate crawling into the sepulchral chamber, which itself is seven paces long by five wide and is surrounded by a bench. The place for two bodies had been prepared under a curved arch."

In 1883, the Palestine Exploration Fund's Survey of Palestine (SWP) noted at Es Simia: "Walls, cisterns, caves, and tombs, principally broken, but one well cut. It is a large ruin, and evidently an ancient site. A courtyard, 23 feet 8 inches by 19 feet 6 inches, is cut in rock in front of the porch, which is 20 feet 9 inches wide and 8 feet to the back. It is supported on two pillars, 14 inches diameter, and two pilasters, all cut in rock with very simple capitals. Over the pillars at 6 feet from the ground is a frieze with 9 medallions, divided by triglyphs. A door 2 feet 3 inches wide leads from the porch into a chamber, 11 feet 7 inches wide, by 9 feet 8 inches to the back. In the right-hand corner at the back is a recess, 2 feet wide, 16 inches to the back. On the right a door 2 feet wide leads into another chamber 6 feet square."

=== British Mandate era ===
In the 1931 census of Palestine, conducted by the British Mandate authorities, Khirbat al-Simia, together with As-Samu and Kh. Rafat had a total of 1,882 Muslims, in 372 houses.

=== Jordanian era ===
In the wake of the 1948 Arab–Israeli War and the 1949 Armistice Agreements, Khirbat al-Simia came under Jordanian rule.

=== 1967, aftermath ===
Since the Six-Day War in 1967, the village has been under Israeli occupation. The population in the 1967 census conducted by the Israeli authorities was 267.

== Bibliography ==
- Conder, C.R.; Kitchener, H.H. (1883). The Survey of Western Palestine: Memoirs of the Topography, Orography, Hydrography, and Archaeology. Vol. 3. London: Committee of the Palestine Exploration Fund.
- Guérin, V. (1869). Description Géographique Historique et Archéologique de la Palestine (in French). Vol. 1: Judee, pt. 3. Paris: L'Imprimerie Nationale.
- Hütteroth, W.-D.; Abdulfattah, K. (1977). Historical Geography of Palestine, Transjordan and Southern Syria in the Late 16th Century. Erlanger Geographische Arbeiten, Sonderband 5. Erlangen, Germany: Vorstand der Fränkischen Geographischen Gesellschaft. ISBN 3-920405-41-2.
- Mills, E., ed. (1932). Census of Palestine 1931. Population of Villages, Towns and Administrative Areas. Jerusalem: Government of Palestine.
- Palmer, E.H. (1881). The Survey of Western Palestine: Arabic and English Name Lists Collected During the Survey by Lieutenants Conder and Kitchener, R. E. Transliterated and Explained by E.H. Palmer. Committee of the Palestine Exploration Fund.
- Robinson, E.; Smith, E. (1841). Biblical Researches in Palestine, Mount Sinai and Arabia Petraea: A Journal of Travels in the year 1838. Vol. 3. Boston: Crocker & Brewster.
