= Outline of reptiles =

Overview and topical guide to reptiles

The following outline is provided as an overview of and topical guide to reptiles:

Reptiles, as commonly defined, are tetrapod vertebrate animals with an ectothermic metabolism and amniotic development. Reptiles traditionally comprise four orders: Testudines (turtles), Crocodilia (crocodiles, alligators and gharials), Squamata (lizards and snakes) and Rhynchocephalia (tuatara), with about 12,000 extant species listed in the Reptile Database. The study of the traditional reptile orders, customarily in combination with the study of modern amphibians, is called herpetology.

== What type of thing are reptiles? ==
A reptile can be described as all of the following:

- Lifeform
  - Animal
    - Chordate
      - Vertebrate
        - Amniote
    - Ectotherm

== Types of reptiles ==
List of reptiles

- List of largest reptiles
  - List of largest extant lizards
- Lists of reptiles by region
- List of U.S. state reptiles
- Marine reptile
  - List of marine reptiles

=== Reptile classifications ===
- List of reptile genera
- Testudines
- Crocodilia
- Squamata
- Rhynchocephalia

=== Examples of reptiles ===
- Alligator
- Crocodile
- Lizard
  - Gecko
  - Iguana
    - Hybrid iguana
  - Komodo dragon
- Snake
  - Python
- Tortoise
- Tuatara
- Turtle

== History of reptiles ==
- Reptile egg fossil

=== History of the study of reptiles ===
- 2014 in reptile paleontology
- 2015 in reptile paleontology
- 2017 in reptile paleontology
- 2018 in reptile paleontology
- 2019 in reptile paleontology
- 2020 in reptile paleontology
- 2021 in reptile paleontology
- 2022 in reptile paleontology
- 2023 in reptile paleontology

=== Evolutionary history of reptiles ===
==== Evolution of reptiles ====
Evolution of reptiles

- Archosauromorpha
- Lepidosauromorpha

==== Extinct reptiles ====
- List of largest extinct lizards
- Parareptilia
- Captorhinidae
- Araeoscelidia
- Neodiapsida
- Drepanosauromorpha
- Younginiformes
- Ichthyosauromorpha
- Thalattosauria
- Lepidosauriformes

== Characteristics of reptiles ==
- Reptile scales

== Reptile reproduction ==
- Reptile incubation

== Human impact on reptiles ==
- Herpetoculture
- Herping
- Human uses of reptiles

== Reptile conservation ==
- Reptile centres
- Reptile organizations

=== Endangered reptiles lists ===
- List of least concern reptiles
- List of data deficient reptiles
- List of near threatened reptiles
- List of vulnerable reptiles
- List of endangered reptiles
- List of critically endangered reptiles

== Reptile centres ==
Reptile centre

- Alice Springs Reptile Centre
- Armadale Reptile Centre
- Australian Reptile Park
- Clyde Peeling's Reptiland
- Colorado Gators Reptile Park
- Crocodile Rehabilitation and Research Centre
- Indian River Reptile and Dinosaur Park
- Kentucky Reptile Zoo
- Komodo Indonesian Fauna Museum and Reptile Park
- Melaka Butterfly and Reptile Sanctuary
- Reptile Gardens
- Reptile World Serpentarium
- Sleeping Turtles Preserve
- Snakes Down Under Reptile Park and Zoo
- The Reptile Zoo
- West Australian Reptile Park

== Reptile organizations ==
- Amphibian and Reptile Conservation Trust
- British Herpetological Society
- Friends of Snakes Society
- International Reptile Rescue
- Katala Foundation
- Snake Cell Andhra Pradesh
- Society for the Study of Amphibians and Reptiles
- United States Association of Reptile Keepers

== Reptile publications ==
=== Periodicals on reptiles ===
- Practical Reptile Keeping
- Reptiles

=== Scientific journals covering reptiles ===
- African Journal of Herpetology
- Bibliotheca Herpetologica
- Caribbean Herpetology
- Chelonian Conservation and Biology
- Herpetologica
- Herpetological Conservation and Biology
- Herpetological Monographs
- Ichthyology & Herpetology

=== Reptile databases ===
- Reptile Database

== Persons influential in reptile-related activities ==
- List of herpetologists

== See also ==
- Bird
  - Outline of birds
  - List of birds
