= Eldem (surname) =

Eldem is a surname. It is employed in Britain as well as in Turkey and Cyprus. Notable people with the surname are as follows:

- Burak Eldem (born 1961), Turkish writer
- Halil Edhem Eldem (1861–1938), Ottoman Turkish politician and archaeologist
- Sadi Eldem (1910–1995), Turkish diplomat
- Sedad Hakkı Eldem (1908–1988), Turkish architect
