= Osman Hamdi Bey =

Ottoman administrator, intellectual and artist (1842–1910)

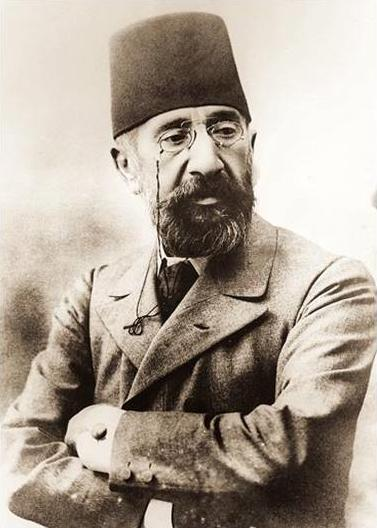
- Born: Osman Hamdi; 30 December 1842; Constantinople, Ottoman Empire
- Died: 24 February 1910 (aged 67); Constantinople, Ottoman Empire
- Known for: Painter, archaeologist, museographer and writer
- Notable work: The Tortoise Trainer

Osman Hamdi Bey (30 December 1842 – 24 February 1910) was an Ottoman administrator, intellectual, art expert and also a prominent and pioneering painter. He was the Ottoman Empire's first archaeologist and first museologist and he is regarded as the founding father of museology, archaeology, fine arts education and museum curator's professions in Turkey.

He was also the founder of Istanbul Archaeology Museums and of the Istanbul Academy of Fine Arts (Turkish: Sanayi-i Nefise Mektebi) known today as the Mimar Sinan Fine Arts University. He was also the first mayor of Kadıköy.

== Early life ==
Osman Hamdi was the son of Ibrahim Edhem Pasha, an Ottoman Grand Vizier (in office 1877–1878, replacing Midhat Pasha) who was originally a Greek boy from the Ottoman island of Sakız (Chios) orphaned at a very young age following the Chios massacre there. Ibrahim was adopted by Kaptan-ı Derya (Grand Admiral) Hüsrev Pasha and eventually rose to the ranks of the ruling class of the Ottoman Empire. His mother, Fatma Hanım, was the daughter of Hacı Mustafa Ağa, the steward of the drapers (yağlıkçılar kâhyası) during the reign of Sultan Abdülmecid who had migrated from Isparta to Istanbul. Osman was extremely proud of his Greek descent, often mentioning it in educated circles; this caused him to have a number of Greek collaborators and acquaintances throughout his life, including from the Kingdom of Greece.

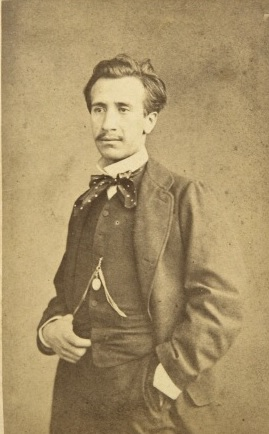
Osman Hamdi in his youth

Osman Hamdi went to primary school in the popular Istanbul quarter of Beşiktaş; after which he studied law, first in Constantinople (1856) and then in Paris (1860). However, he decided to pursue his interest in painting instead, left the Law program, and trained under French orientalist painters Jean-Léon Gérôme and Gustave Boulanger. During his nine-year stay in Paris, the international capital of fine arts at the time, he showed a keen interest for the artistic events of his day.

His stay in Paris was also marked by the first ever visit by an Ottoman sultan to Western Europe, when Sultan Abdülaziz was invited to the Exposition Universelle (1867) by Emperor Napoleon III. He also met many of the Young Ottomans in Paris, and even though he was exposed to their liberal ideas, he did not participate in their political activities, being the son of an Ottoman pasha who was loyal to the sultan and did not challenge the old absolutist system. Osman Hamdi Bey also met his first wife Marie, a French woman, in Paris when he was a student. After receiving his father's blessings, she accompanied him to Constantinople when he returned in 1869, where the two got married and had two daughters.

Once back in Turkey, he was sent to the Baghdad Vilayet in Ottoman Iraq, as part of the administrative team of Midhat Pasha (the leading political figure and reformer among the Young Ottomans who enacted the First Ottoman Constitution in 1876, Midhat Pasha served as the Grand Vizier between 1876–1877, before being replaced by İbrahim Edhem Pasha, Osman Hamdi Bey's father.) In 1871, Osman Hamdi returned to Istanbul, as the vice-director of the Protocol Office of the Palace. During the 1870s, he worked on several assignments in the upper echelons of the Ottoman bureaucracy. He was appointed as the first mayor of Kadıköy in 1875, and stayed in that position for one year.

== Career ==
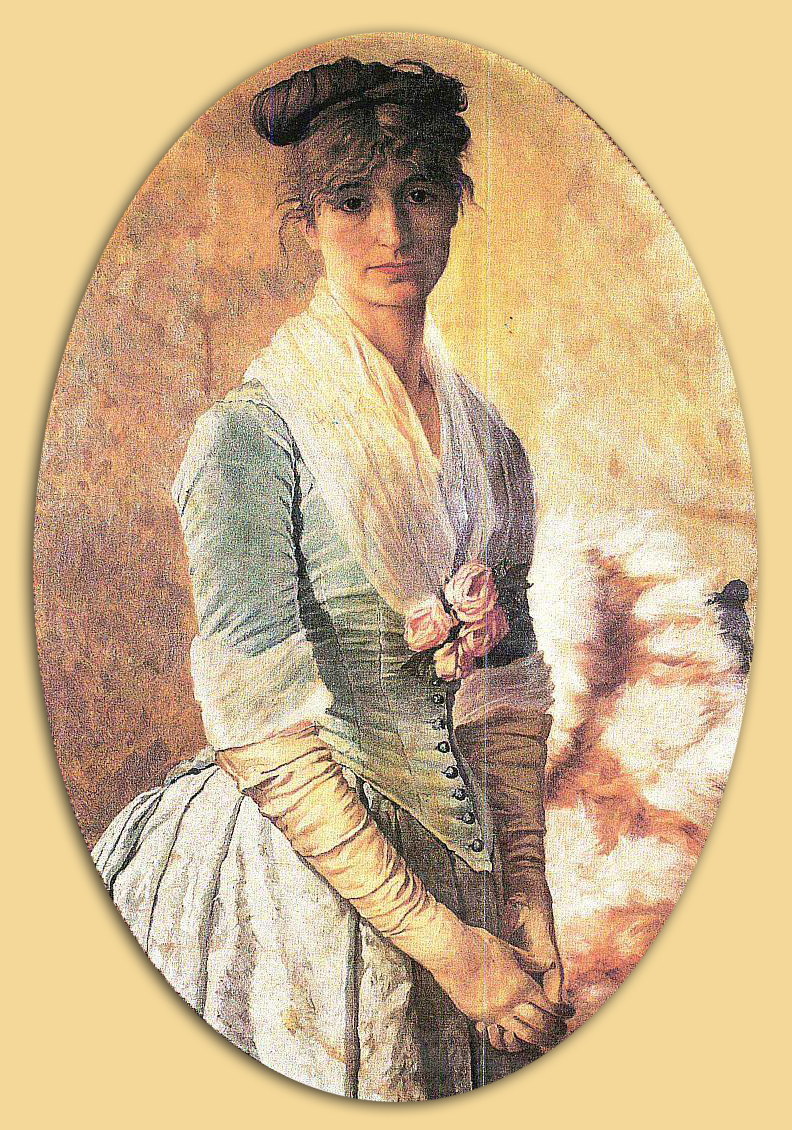
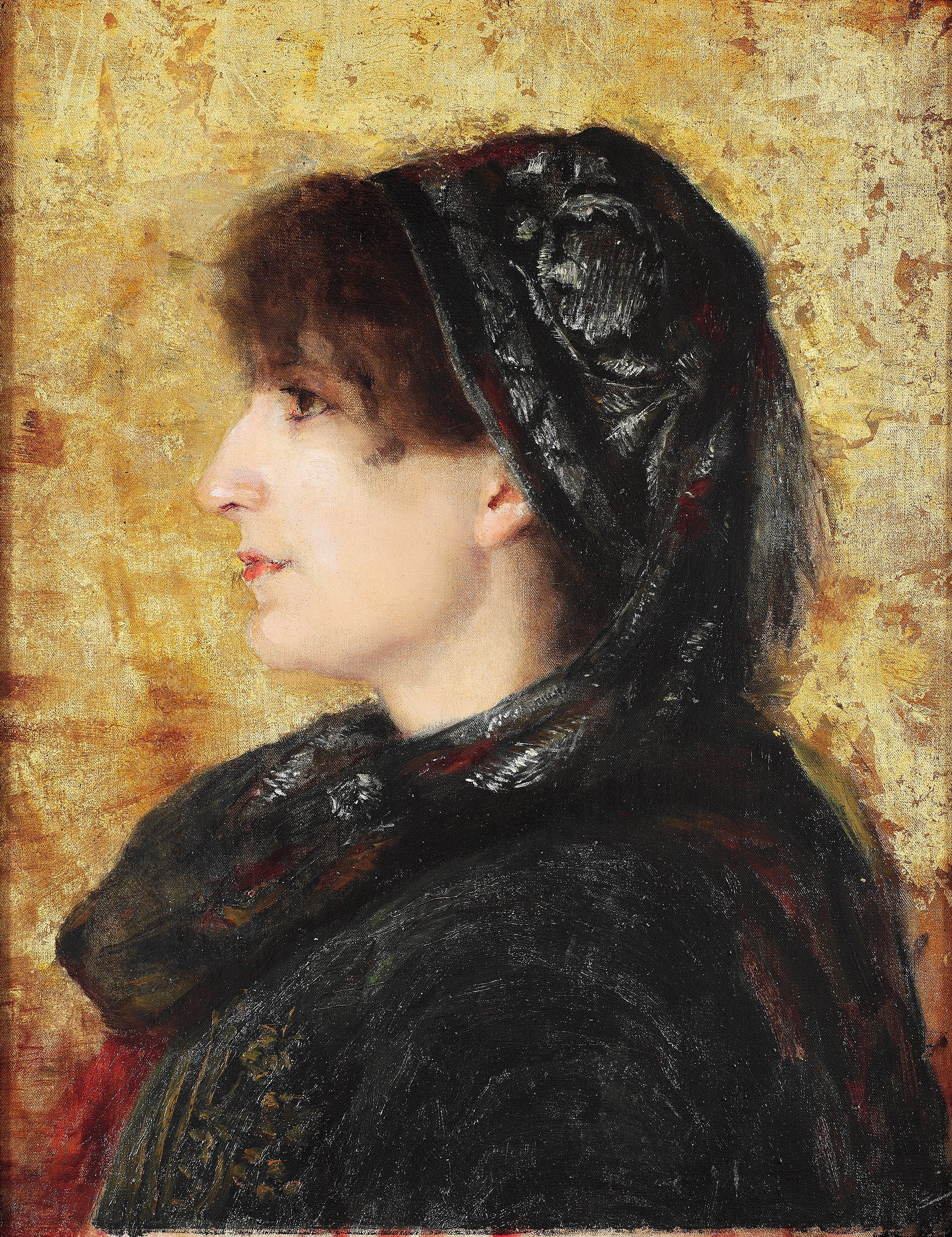
Two portraits by Osman Hamdi Bey of his second wife Marie, who later took the name Naile Hanım. The name of his first wife was also Marie, and both of them were French. From his first wife Marie, whom he met in Paris, he had two daughters named Fatma and Hayriye. From his second wife Marie (Naile Hanım), whom he met in Vienna, he had three daughters named Melek, Leyla and Nazlı, and one son named Edhem.

Osman Hamdi exhibited three paintings at the 1867 Paris Exposition Universelle. None seem to have survived today, but their titles were Repose of the Gypsies, Black Sea Soldier Lying in Wait, and Death of the Soldier. An important step in his career was his assignment as the director of the Imperial Museum (Müze-i Hümayun) in 1881. He used his position as museum director to develop the museum and rewrite the antiquities laws and to create nationally sponsored archaeological expeditions. Osman Hamdi focused on building relationships with international institutions, notably the University of Pennsylvania, from which he received an honorary degree in 1894. In 1902, he painted the excavation of Nippur as a gift to the University of Pennsylvania Museum. He also received a diploma by the Archaeological Society of Athens in 1890.

In 1882, he instituted and became director of the Academy of Fine Arts, which provided Ottomans with training in aesthetics and artistic techniques without leaving the empire. In 1884, he oversaw the promulgation of a law prohibiting historical artifacts from being smuggled abroad (Asar-ı Atîka Nizamnamesi) and claimed exclusive state rights over artifacts, a giant step in constituting a legal framework of preservation of the antiquities in the Ottoman Empire. Osman was influenced by the 1834 Greek law on antiquities, which was also highly restrictive. Representatives or middlemen of 19th-century European Powers routinely smuggled artifacts with historical value from within the boundaries of the Ottoman Empire (which then comprised the geographies of ancient Greek and Mesopotamian civilizations, among others), often resorting to shadily obtained licenses or bribes, to enrich museums in European capitals.

He conducted the first scientific based archaeological researches done by a Turkish team. His digs included sites as varied as the Commagene tomb-sanctuary in Nemrut Dağı in southeastern Anatolia (a top tourist's venue in Turkey and a UNESCO World Heritage Site today, within the Adıyaman Province), the Hekate sanctuary in Lagina in southwestern Anatolia (much less visited, and within the Muğla Province today), and Sidon in Lebanon. The sarcophagi he discovered in Sidon (including the one known as the Alexander Sarcophagus, although this sarcophagus is thought to contain the remains of either Abdalonymus, King of Sidon; or Mazaeus, a Persian noble who was also the governor of Babylon) are considered among the worldwide jewels of archaeological findings. To lodge these, he started building what is today the Istanbul Archaeology Museum in 1881. The museum officially opened in 1891 under his directorship.

Throughout his professional career as museum and academy director, Osman Hamdi continued to paint in the style of his teachers, Gérôme and Boulanger. Yet, he frequently depicted himself and his family members in these paintings, complicating an assumption of a removed orientalist gaze in his work.

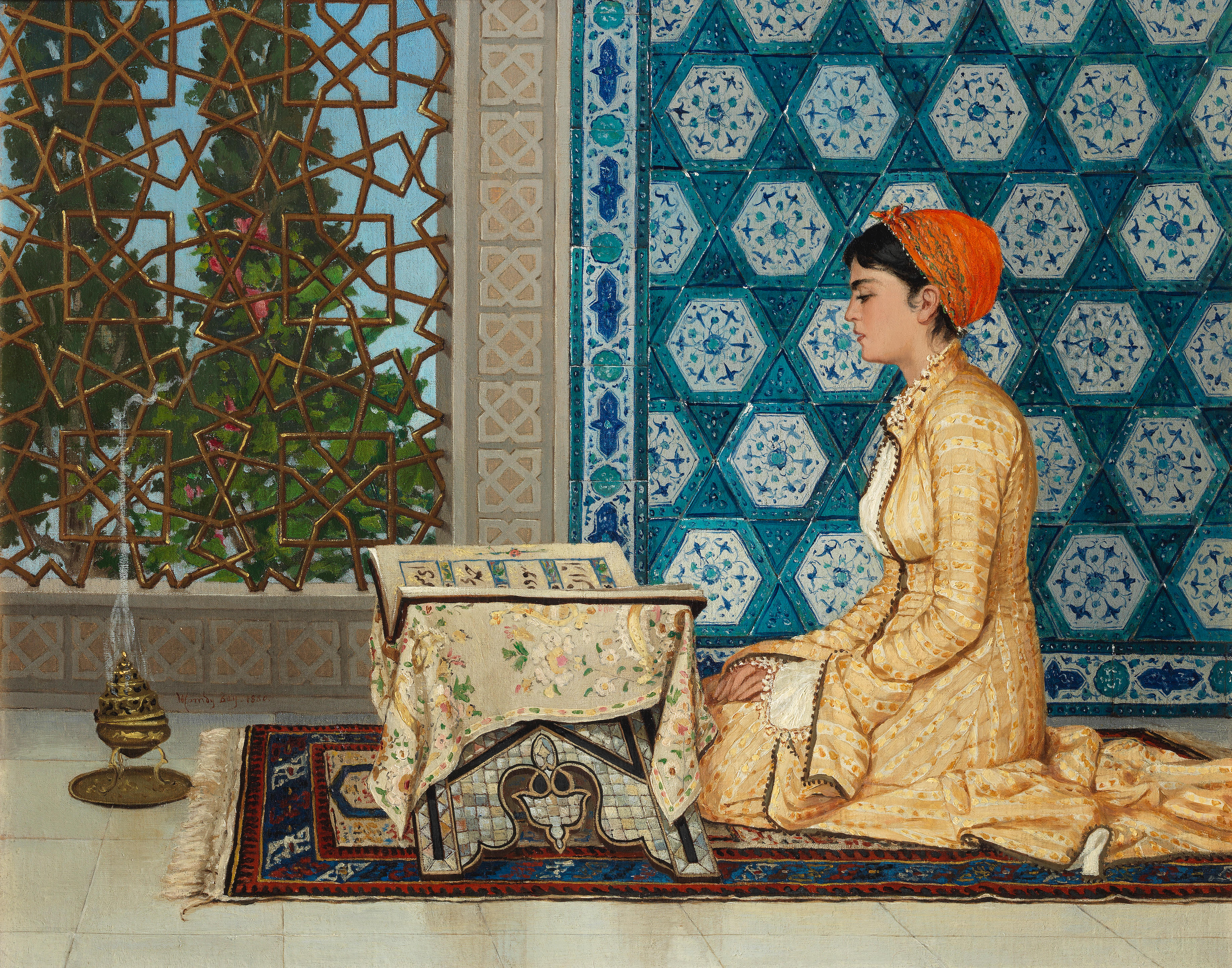
Girl Reciting Qur'an (1880)

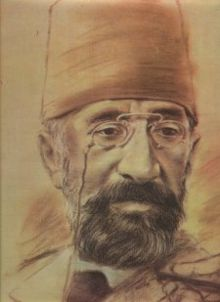
Self-portrait, Osman Hamdi Bey Museum, Gebze

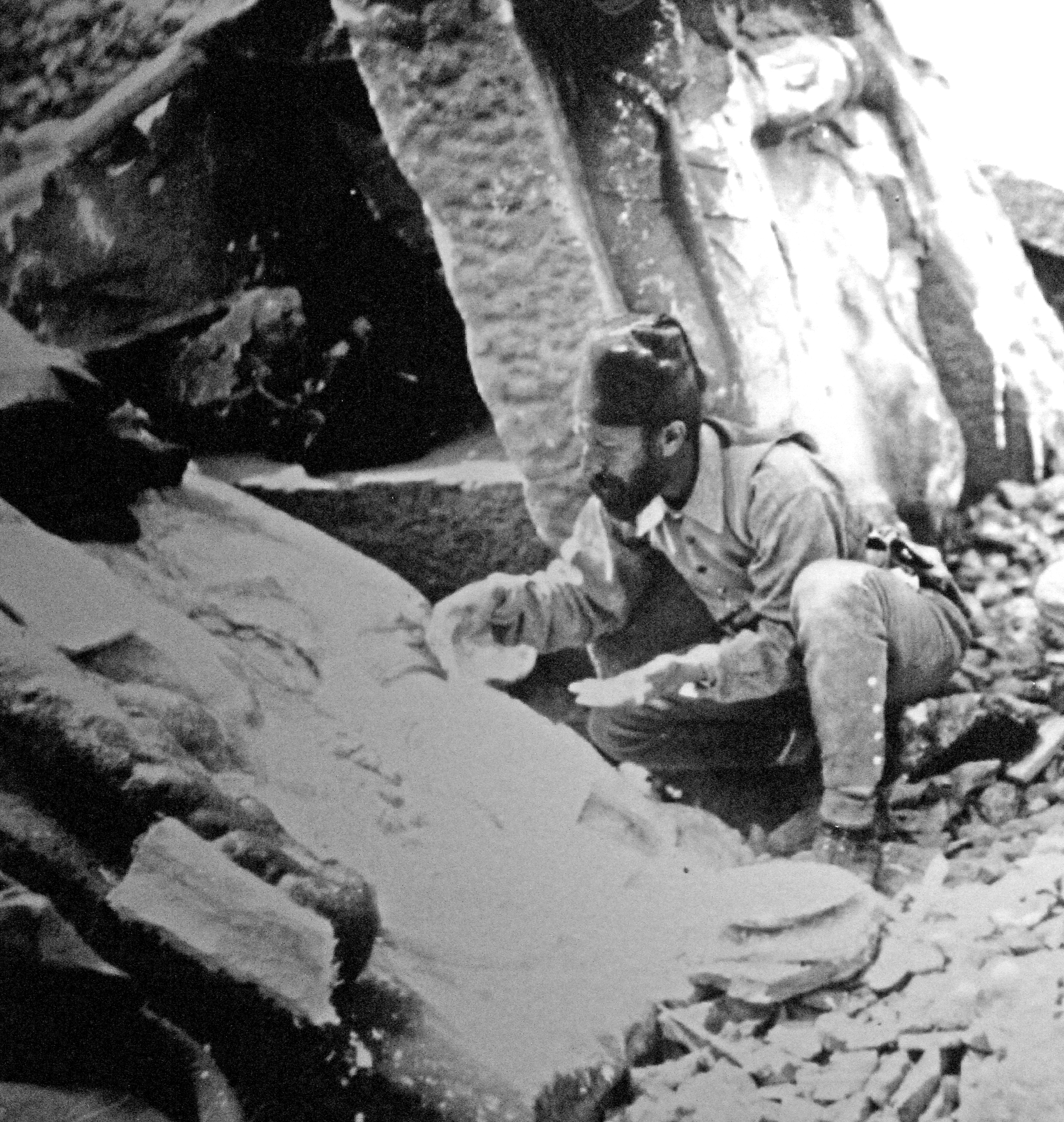
Osman Hamdi Bey excavating at the archaeological site in Mount Nemrut

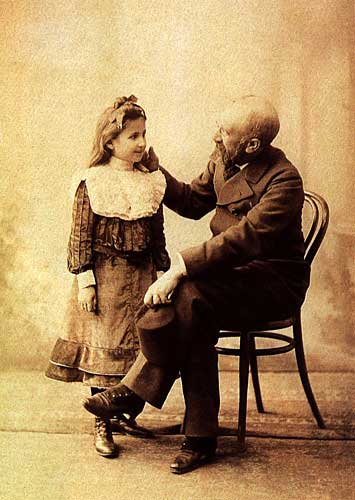
Osman Hamdi Bey with his daughter Nazlı. Osman Hamdi Bey Museum, Gebze.

== The Tortoise Trainer ==
The Tortoise Trainer (1906), Pera Museum, Istanbul

Hamdi's 1906 painting, The Tortoise Trainer, has held the record until 2019 for the most valuable Turkish painting, after being sold for 5 million Turkish liras (approx. US$3.5 million) in December 2004. At the 2004 Artam Antik A.Ç. auction in Istanbul, the Pera Museum and the Turkish Modern Museum fought to acquire the painting, and was ultimately purchased by the Pera Museum. The painting depicts Hamdi's likeness clad in antiquated clothing, training tortoises in a mosque. This choice of subject matter leads many to see this painting as a commentary on Turkey's conflicted national identity. The painting expresses a sarcastic innuendo on the painter's own view of his style of work compared to those of his collaborators and apprentices, and is also a reference to the historical fact of tortoises having been employed for illuminating and decorative purposes, by placing candles on the shell, in evening outings during the Tulip Era in the early 18th century. The painting was acquired by the Suna and İnan Kıraç Foundation and is currently on display at the Pera Museum in Istanbul, which was established by this foundation. His Girl Reciting Qur'an (1880) broke the record by realizing US$7.8 million at a Bonhams auction in September 2019.

Modern researchers have identified the animals portrayed are Testudo graeca ibera, a variety of the Spur-thighed tortoise. A reproduction of the painting appeared on the cover of the Bibliotheca Herpetologica issue in which the paper about the identification was published.

Historian Edhem Eldem has identified the source of the painting as an engraving of a Korean circus entertainer printed in Le Tour du Monde (1869), a popular French travel magazine. The meaning or any symbolic significance of the tortoises is still contested by scholars.

== Work ==
Osman Hamdi was a prolific painter and author, whose work dealt with themes of archaeology, travel and folk customs in the Middle East.

Hamdi studied painting in Paris under Gustave Boulanger and Jean-Léon Gérôme, two prominent artists in the French Orientalist school. Despite being trained by Gérôme and Boulanger, and his reproduction of European orientalist motifs, Hamdi's paintings present Ottoman subjects differently than his contemporaries' works, most notably giving them more active and intellectual roles. Hamdi's status as an Ottoman intellectual causes many to see his use of orientalist motifs as subversive and critical of European orientalism. During his lifetime, his artwork was displayed more frequently in Europe than in Turkey.

From 1880 on, he exhibited in Paris, Vienna, Berlin, Munich and London, and started a Salon in Constantinople. His works bear witness to a patient and conscientious method, and may be considered as documents of art history. He was the first who dared break with the Turkish pictorial tradition.

Among his works are Prophet's Tomb at Brussa, Miraculous Springs (Paris 1904), Reading the Coran 1890, Theologian (Patrimony of the Austrian Court).

These paintings can be found in private collections and in museums in Vienna, Paris, Liverpool, New York, Philadelphia, Berlin and Constantinople (at the Palace of Dolma Bagdsche, at the home of Crown Prince Abdulmejid).

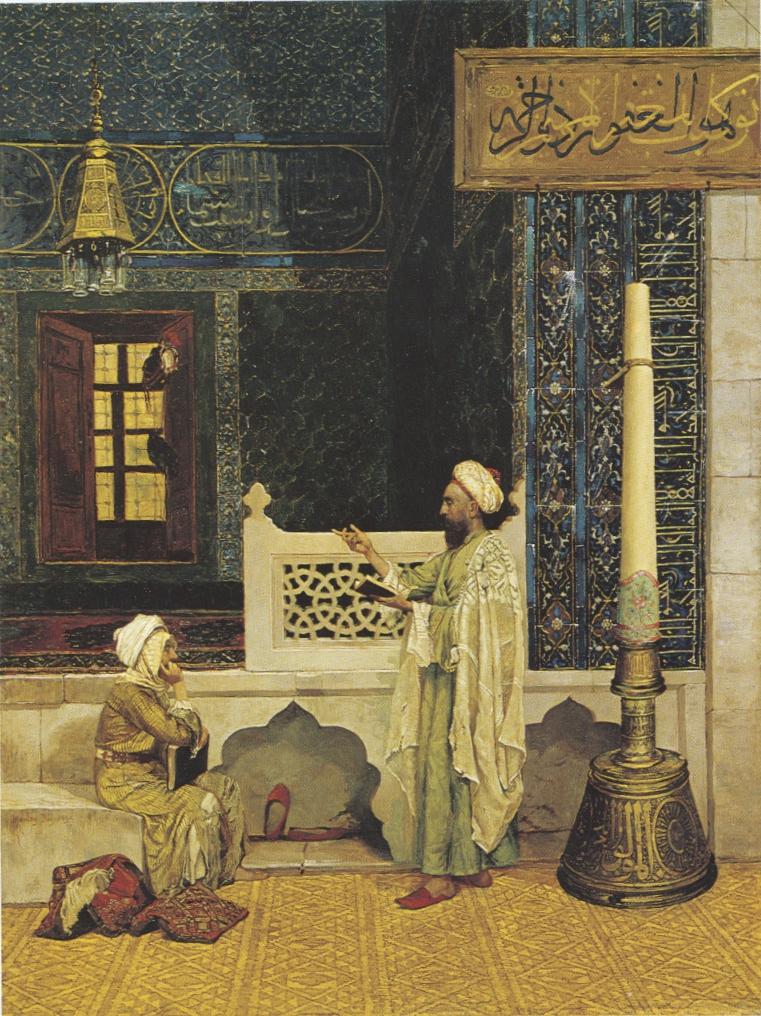
Reading the Coran, by Osman Hamdi Bey, 1890

His painting Reading the Coran has been exhibited at "XI Biennale Internationale des Antiquaires" in Paris in 1982 and at the "Fine Art of the Netherlands" at the Waldorf-Astoria in New York in November 1982.

=== Museums ===
Berlin "Persian Merchant", Constantinople "Girl reading" and Liverpool "Young Emir studying".

=== Select list of publications ===
- Les Costumes Populaires de la Turquie en 1873 (Popular Costumes in Turkey in 1873) by Osman Hamdi Bey, Marie de Launay and photographs by Pascal Sébah, Turkey, Commission Impériale Ottomane pour l'Exposition Universelle de Vienne, 1873.
- Un Ottoman en Orient: Osman Hamdi Bey en Irak, 1869–1871 (An Ottoman in the Orient: Osman Hambdi Bey in Iraq) by Osman Hamdi Bey, Rudolf Lindau, Marie de Launay and Edhem Eldem, c. 1871.
- Une Nécropole Royale à Sidon: Fouilles de Hamdy Bey (A Royal Necropolis in Sidon: Excavations by Hamdy Bey) by Osman Hamdi Bey, Paris, E. Leroux, 1892.
- Le voyage à Nemrud Dağı d'Osman Hamdi Bey et Osgan Efendi (1883): récit de voyage et photographies (The trip to Nemrud Dağı by Osman Hamdi Bey and Osgan Efendi (1883): travelogue and photographs) by Osman Hamdi Bey, Paris, 1883.
- Le Tumulus de Nemrut-Dagi (The Nemrut-Dagi Mound), by Osman Hamdi Bey, Constantinople, F. Lœffler, 1883.

=== Selected paintings ===
The Tortoise Trainer (1906)

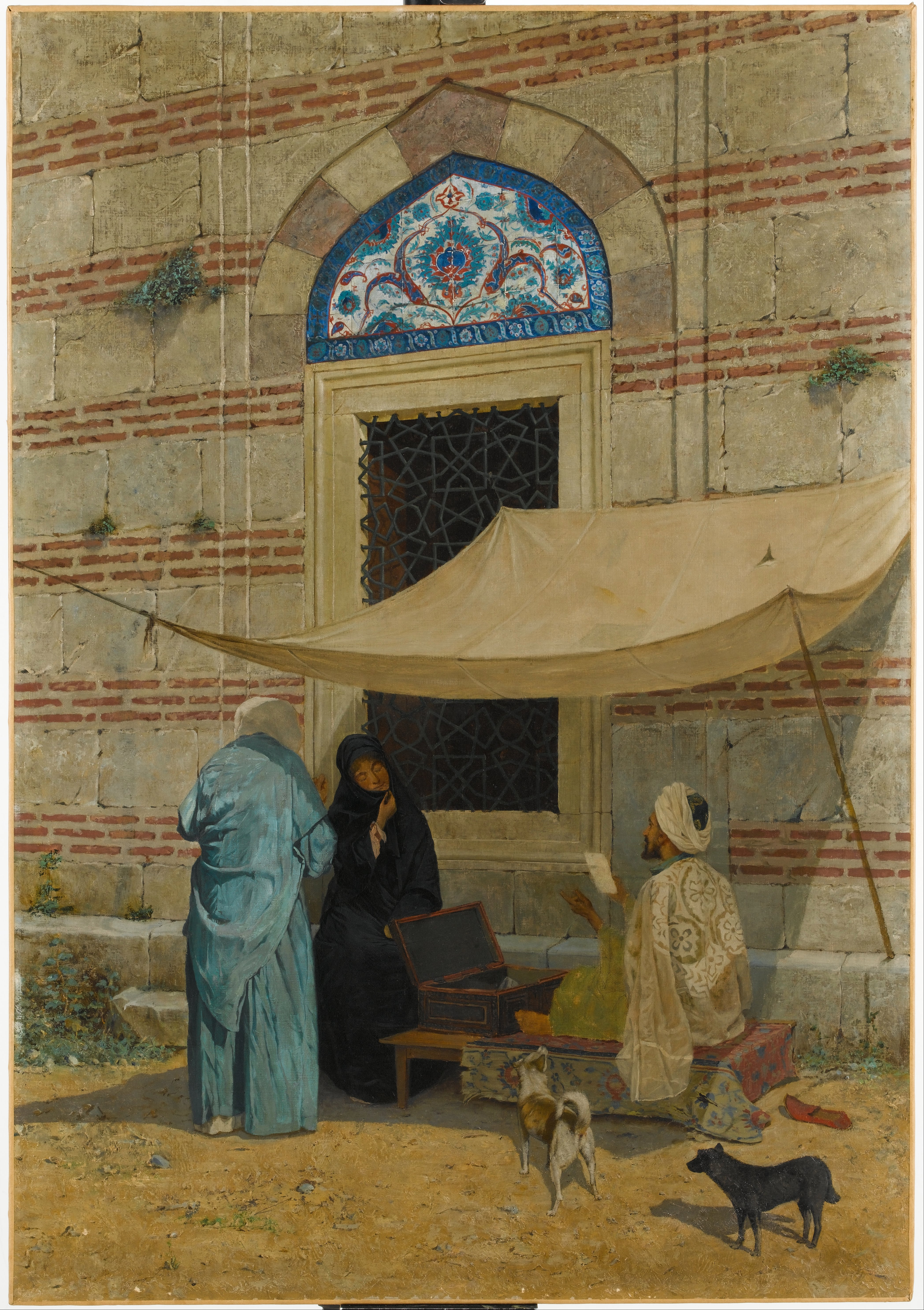
Scrivener (1910)

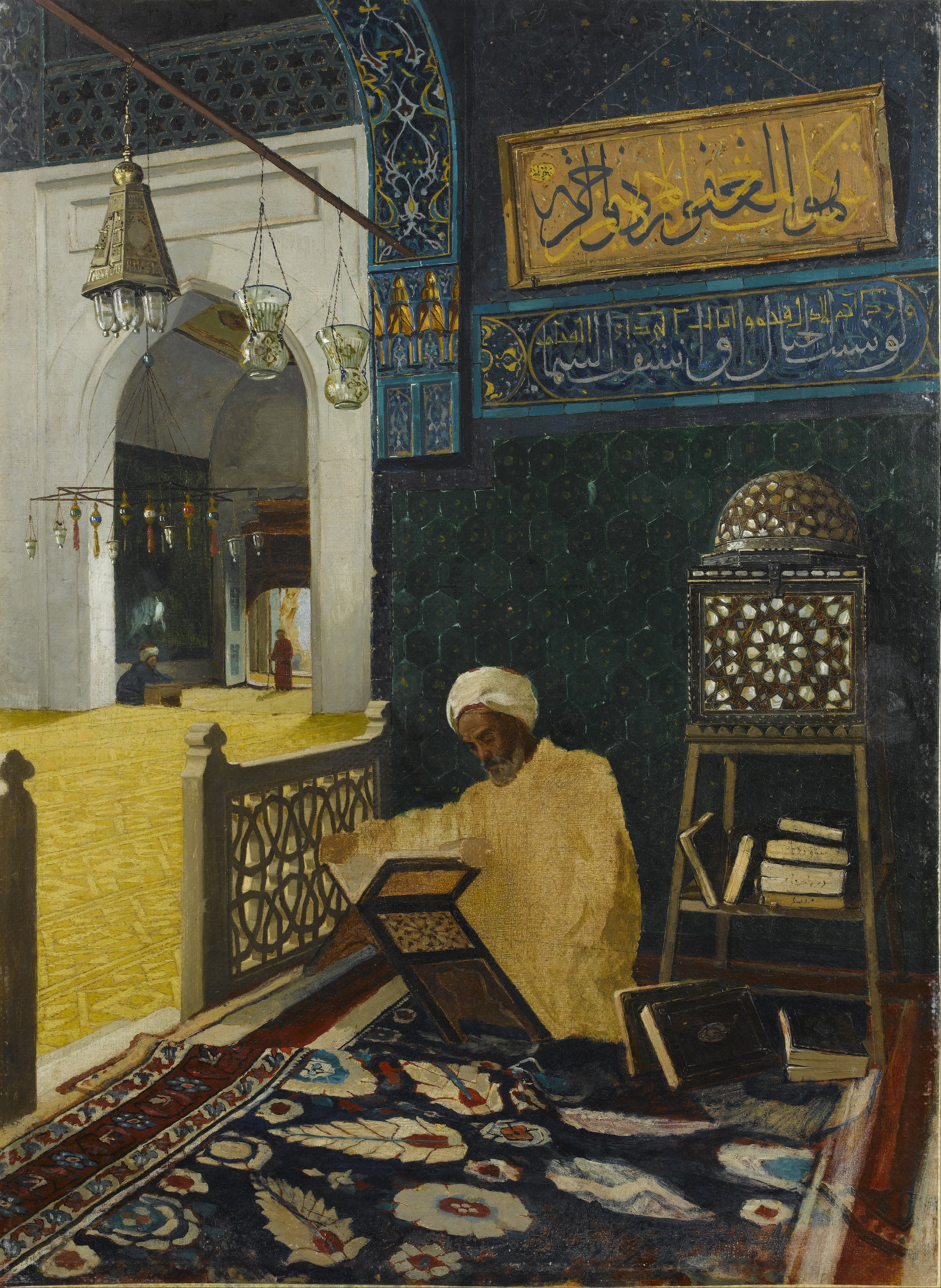
Man reading the Quran (1910)

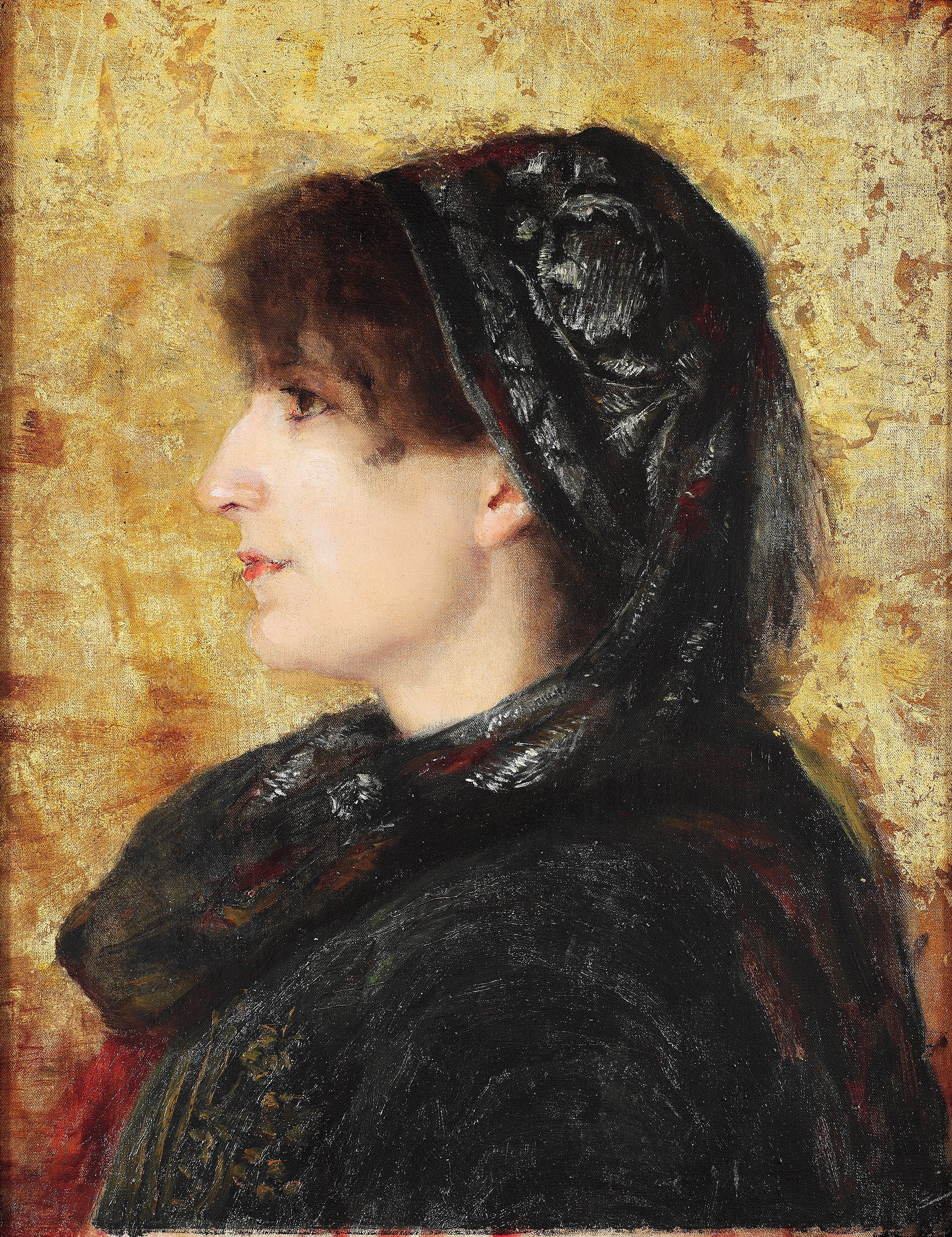
Lady Naile (1910)

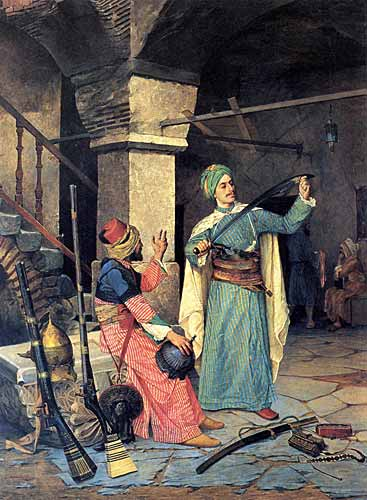
Arms Dealer (1908)

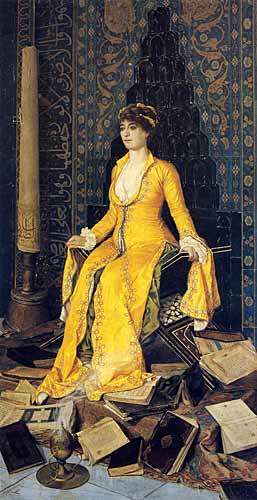
Mihrab (1901)

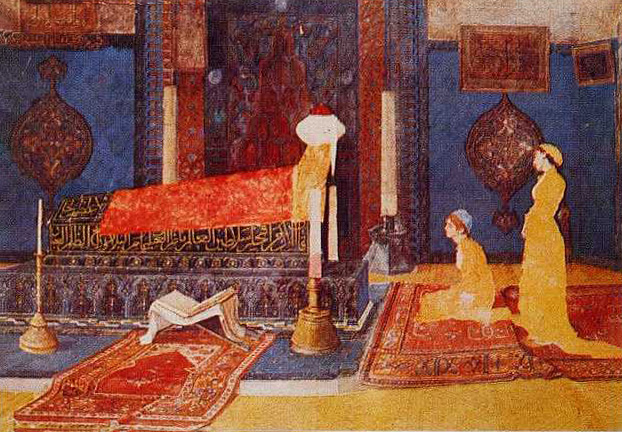
Two Young Girls visiting a Türbe (1890)

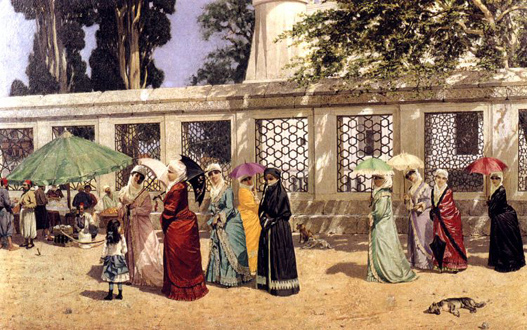
Women in Travel (1887)

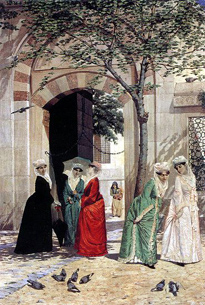
Women in Front of Mosque (1882)

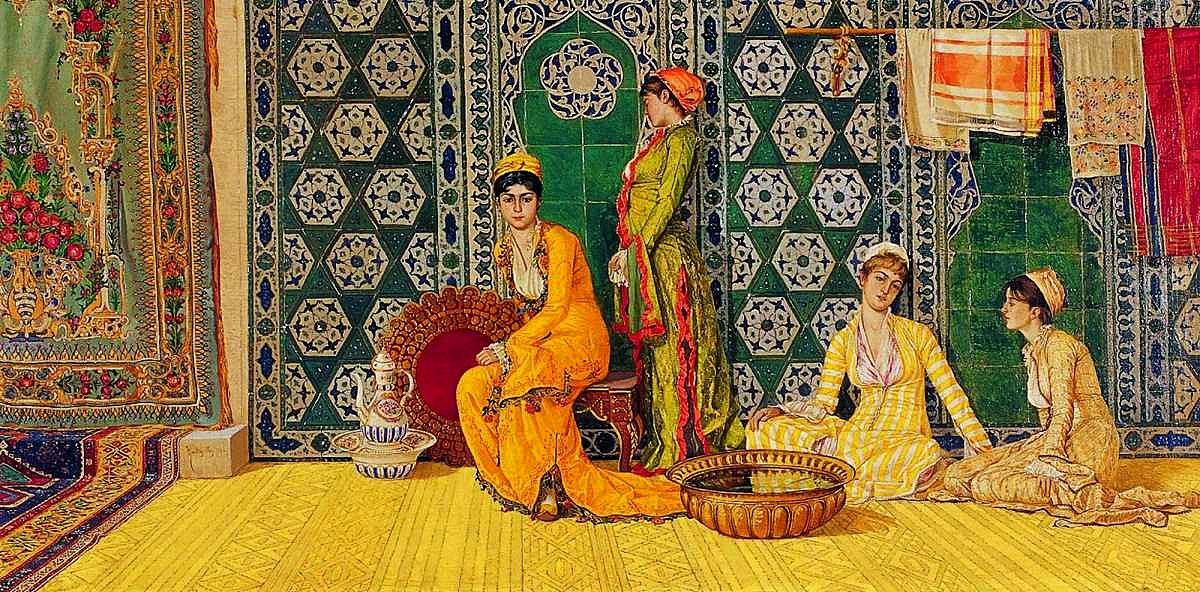
From Harem (1880)

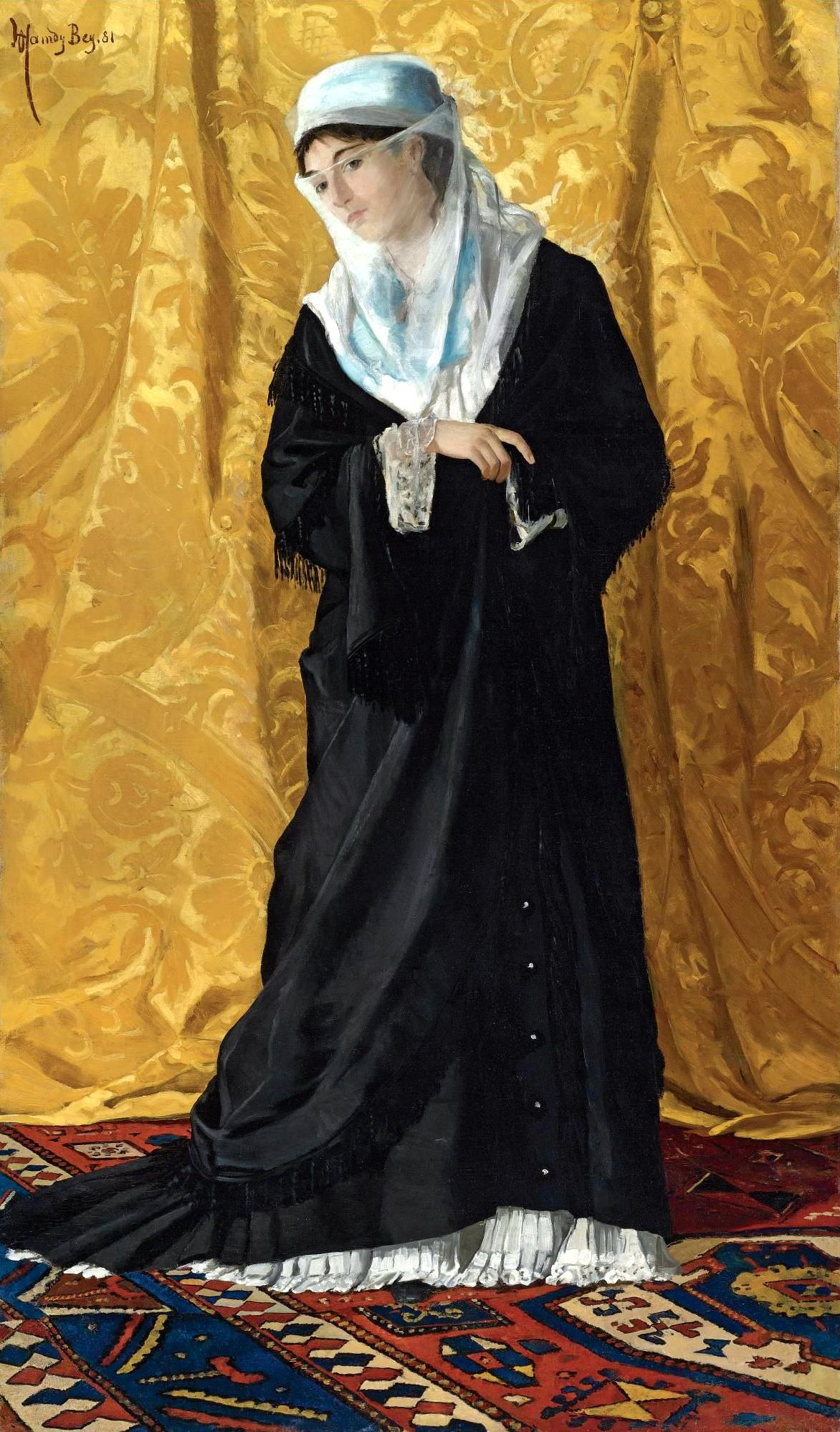
A Lady of Constantinople (1881)

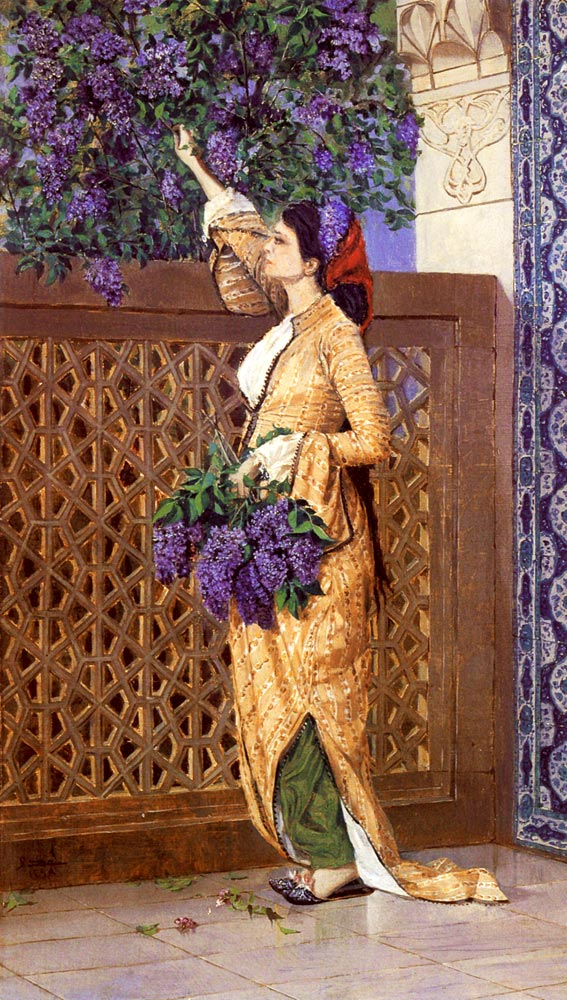
The Girl Who is Picking Up Lilac (1881)

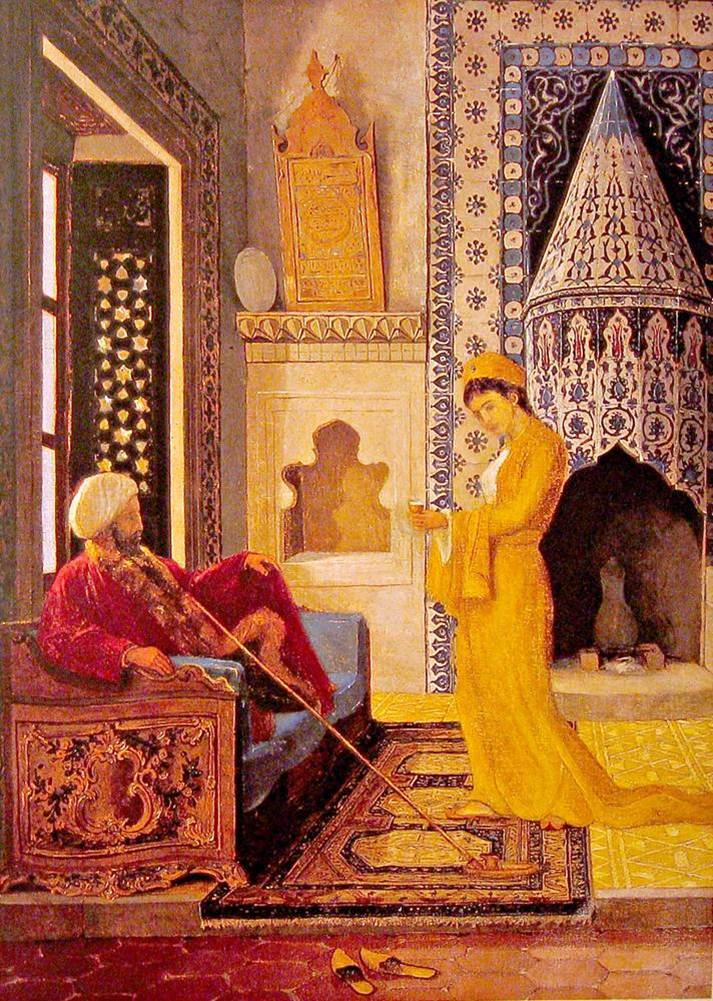
(1879)

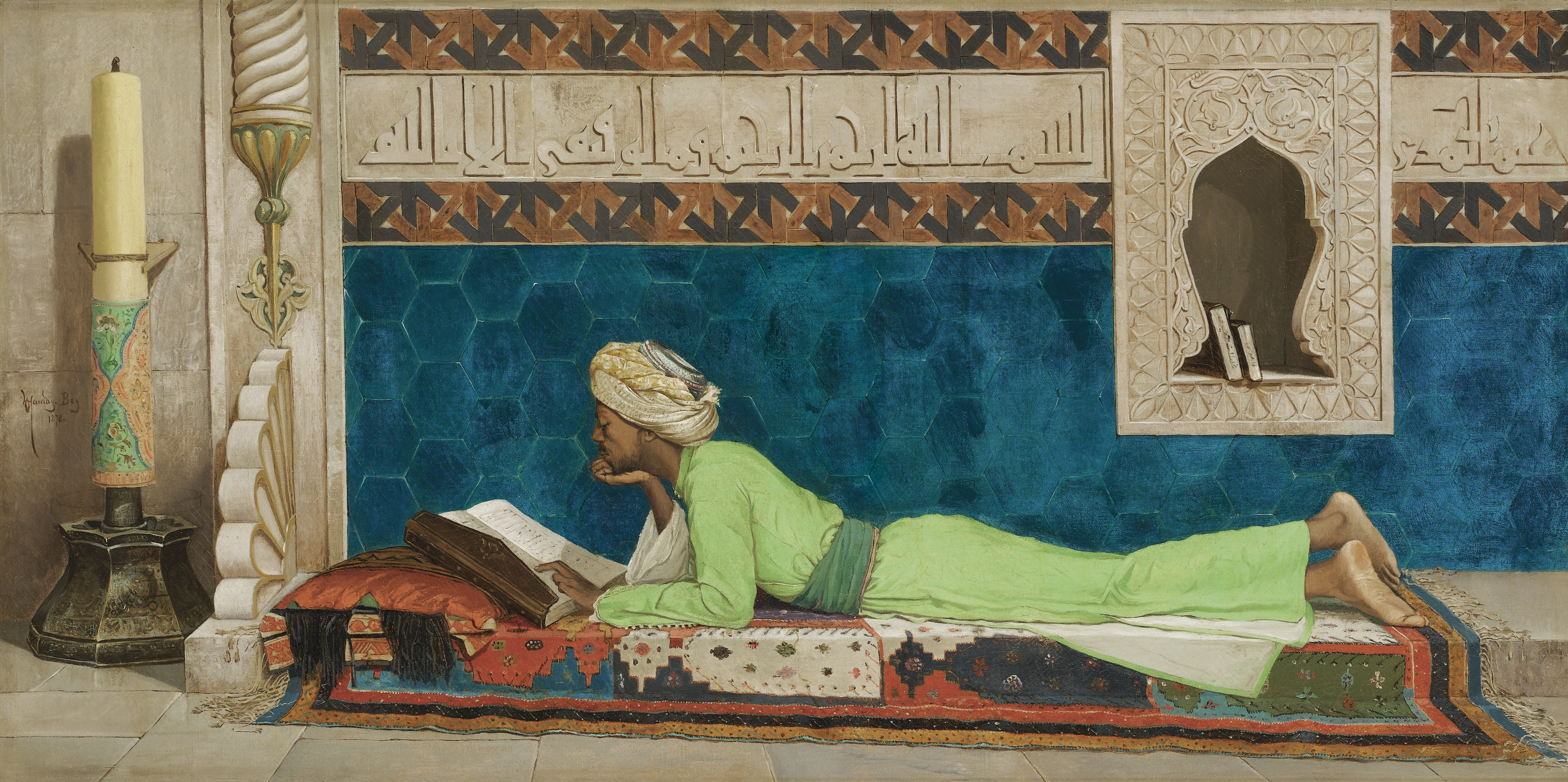
Scholar (1878)

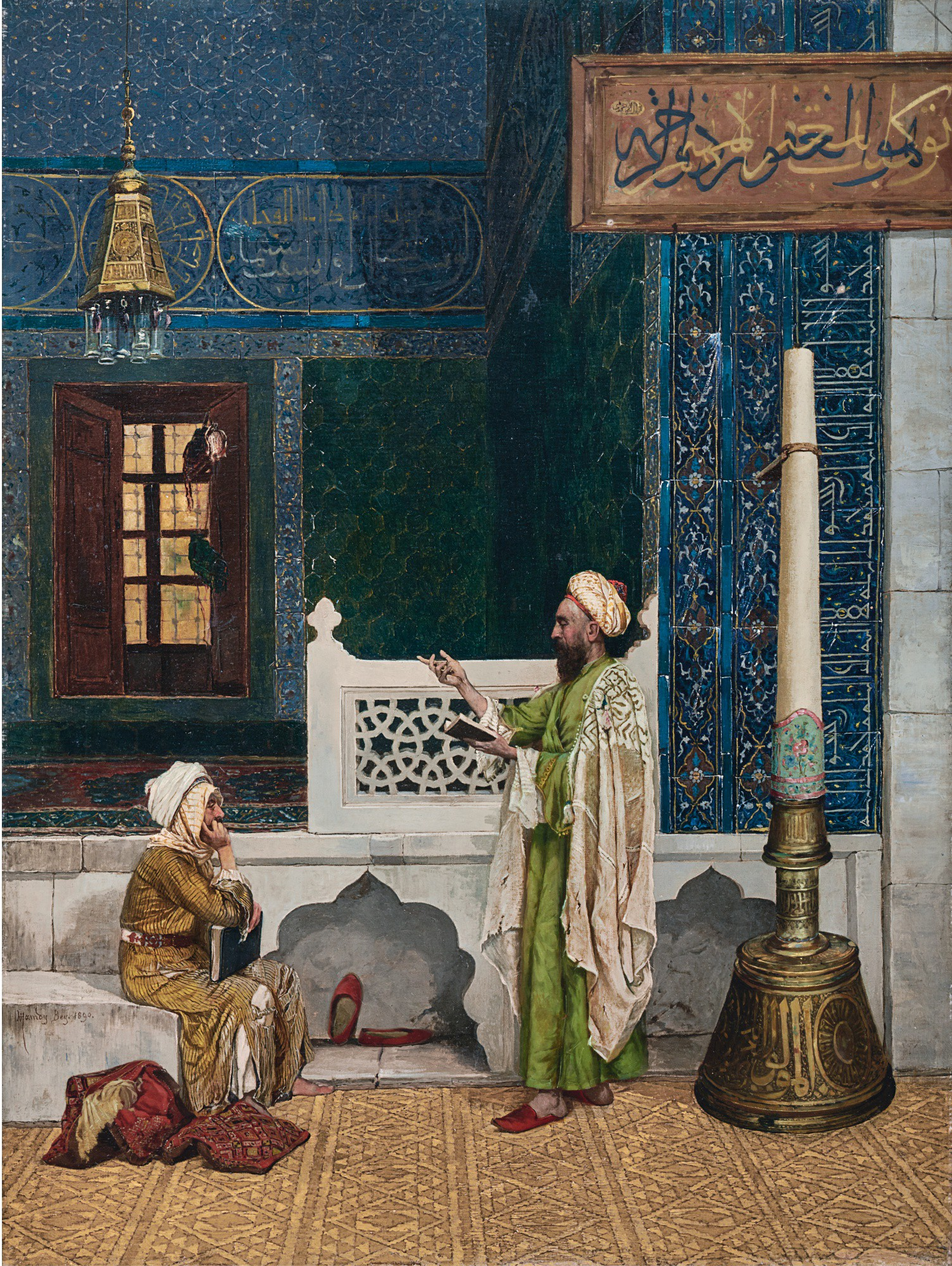
Reading the Coran (1890)

=== Paintings at the Pera Museum, Istanbul ===
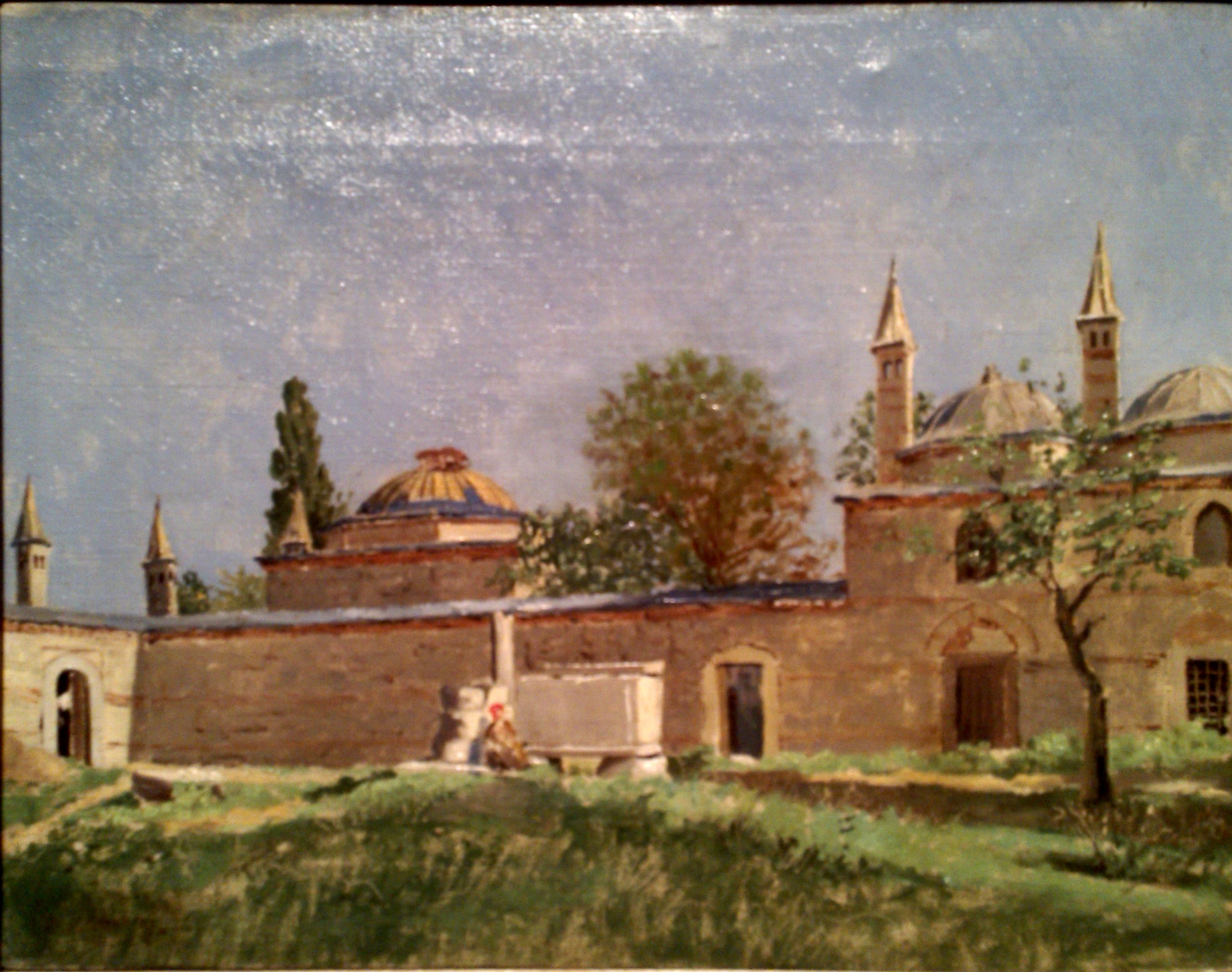
Külliye of Çoban Mustafa Pasha in Gebze (1880s)

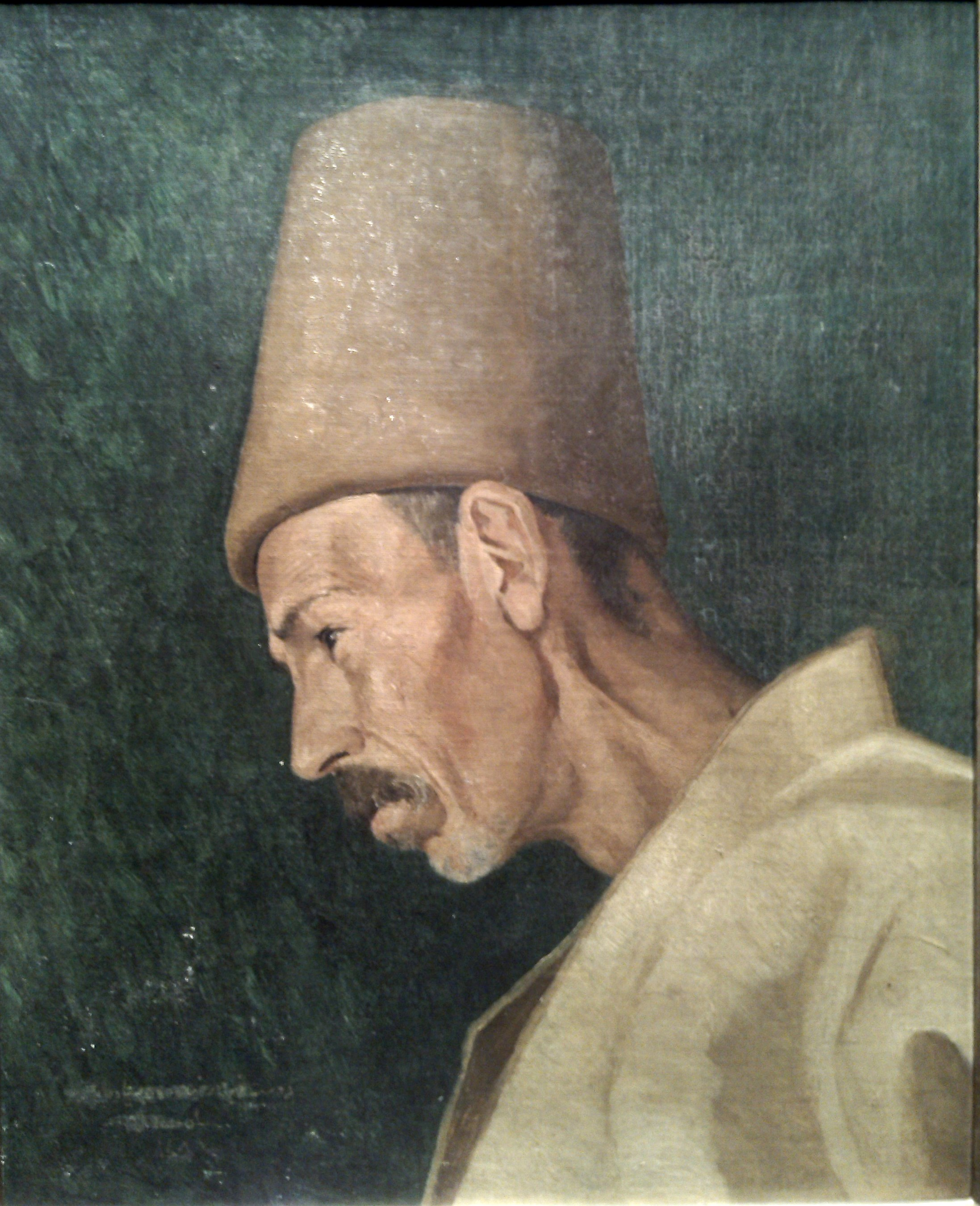
Kökenoğlu Riza Efendi (1871)

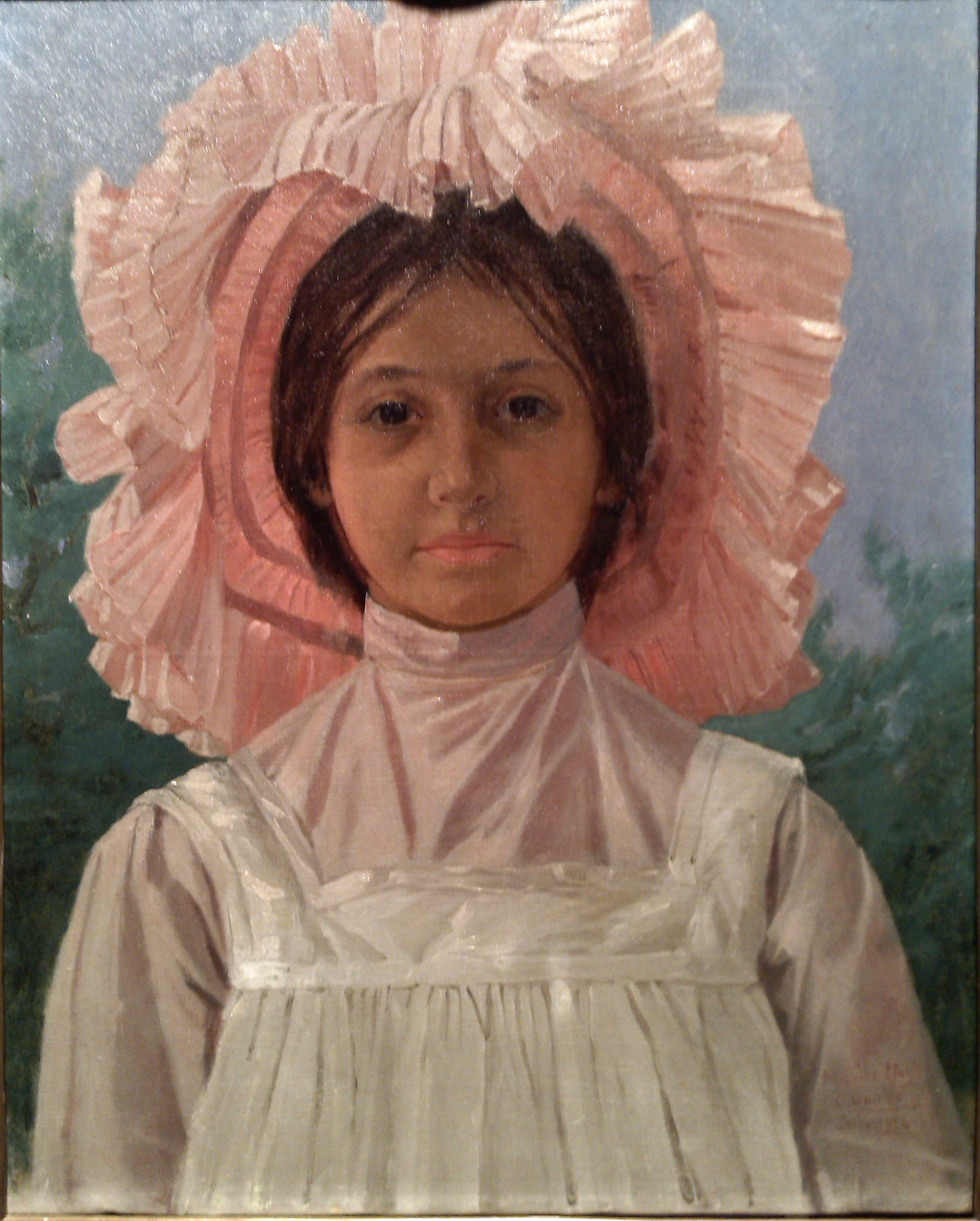
Girl with Pink Cap (June 1904)

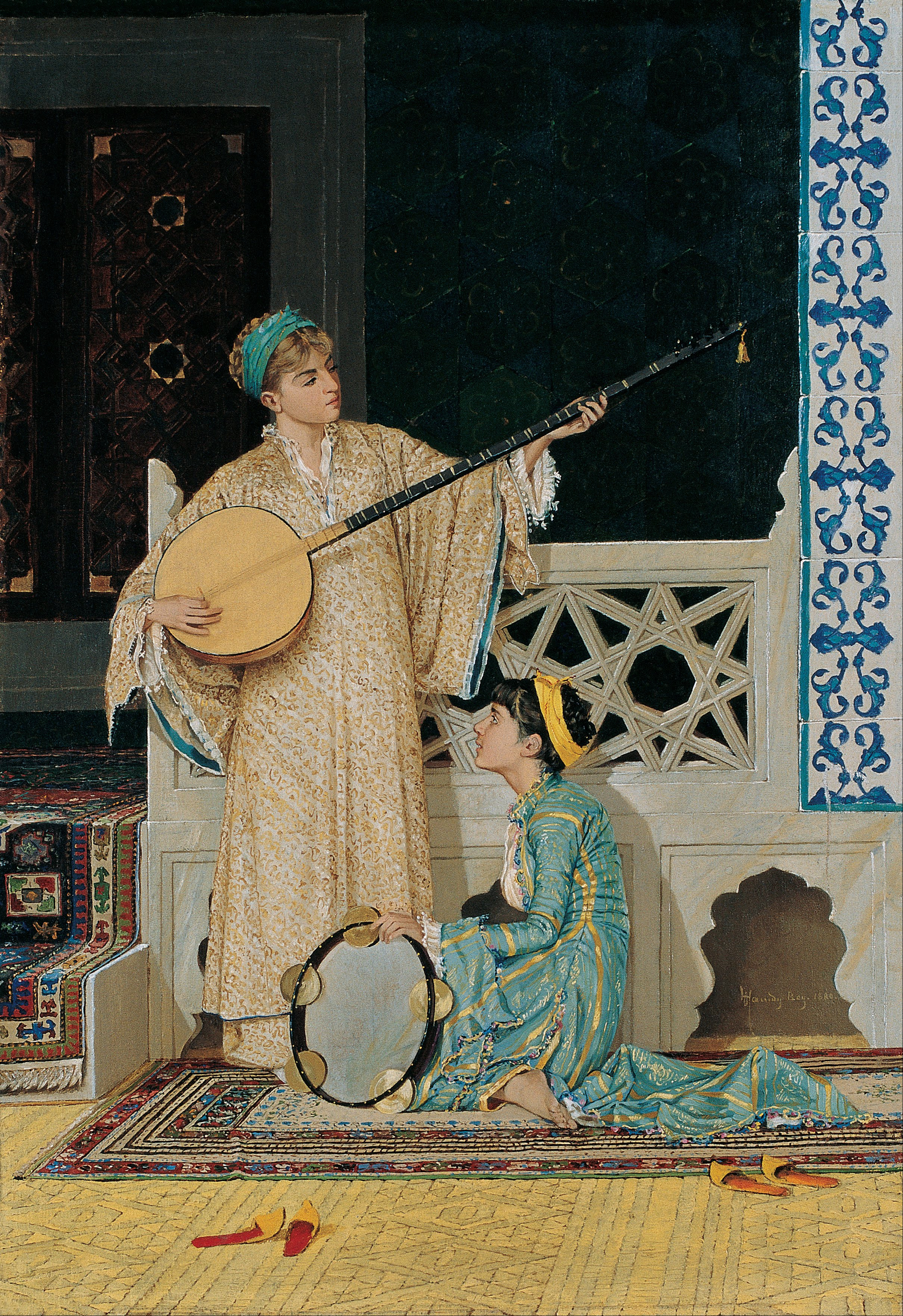
Two Musician Girls (1880)

=== Paintings at museums outside Turkey ===
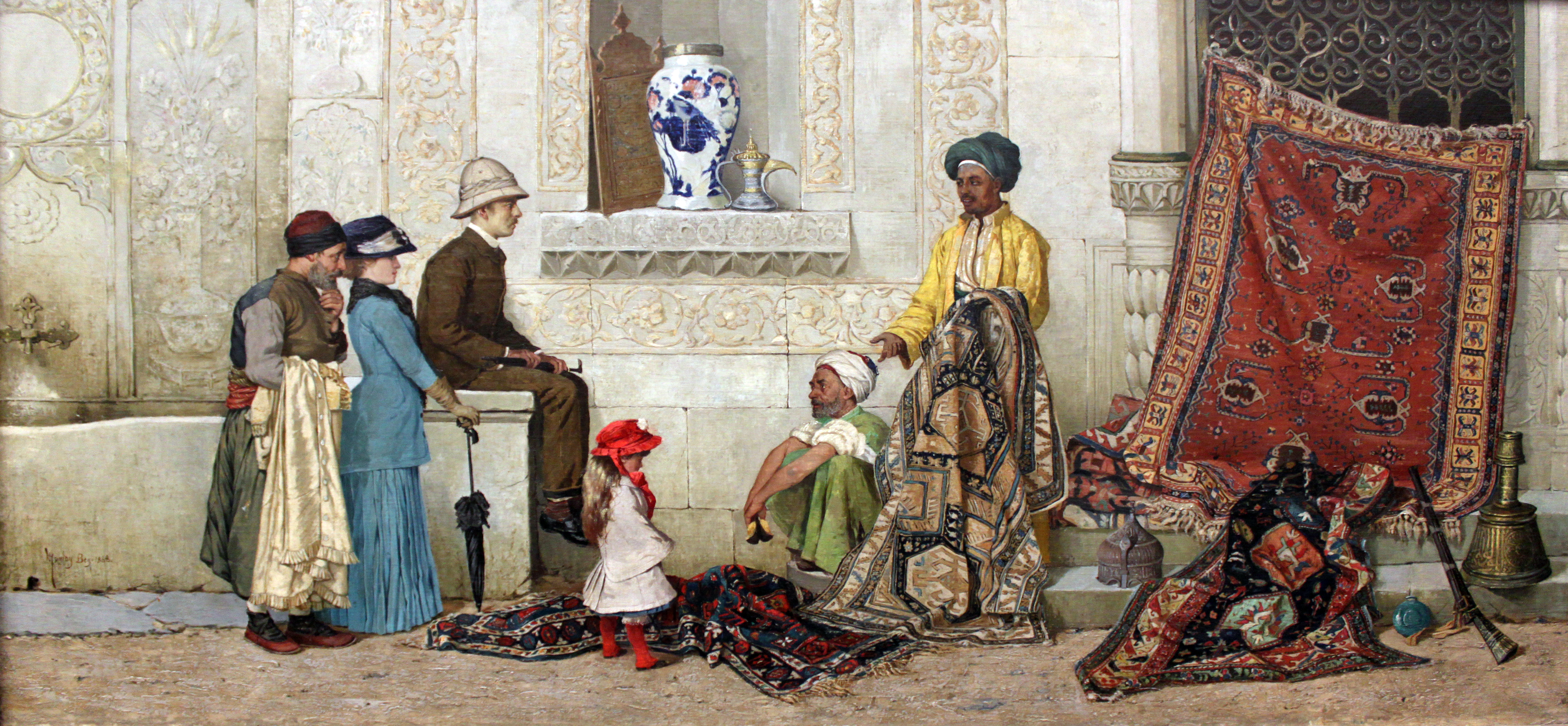
Persian carpet dealer on the street (1888), Alte Nationalgalerie, Berlin

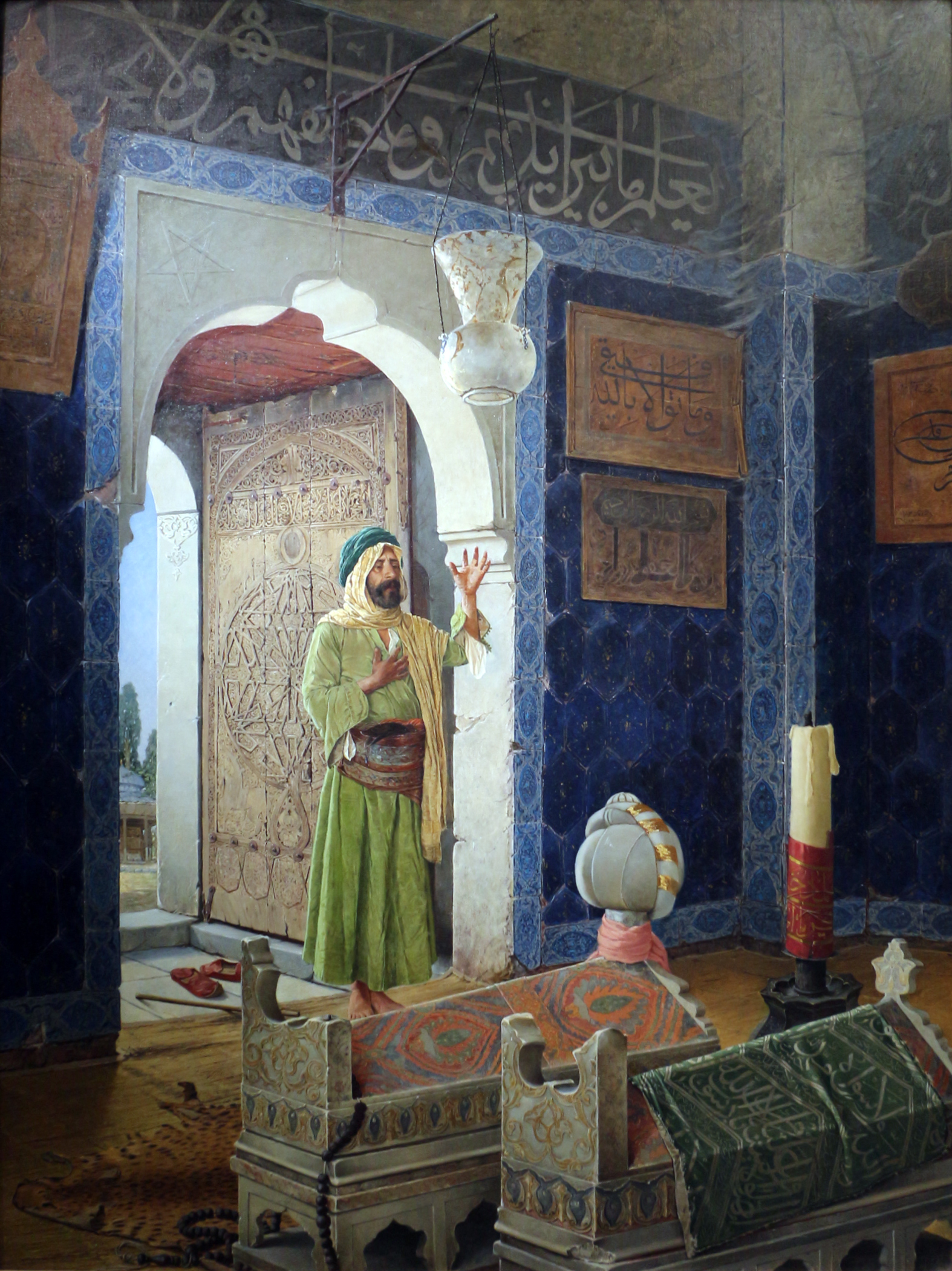
Man in front of children's tombs in a türbe (1903), Musée d'Orsay, Paris

Man Meditating over the Qur'an (1902), Belvedere Museum, Vienna

== Family ==
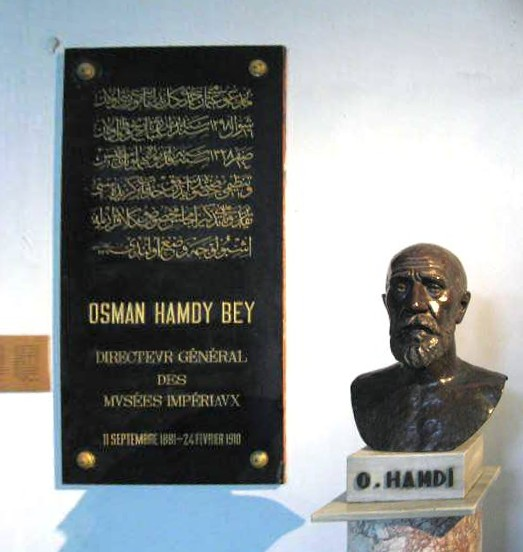
Bust and memorial plaque to Osman Hamdi Bey, made by Yervant Voskan, located at the Istanbul Archaeology Museums

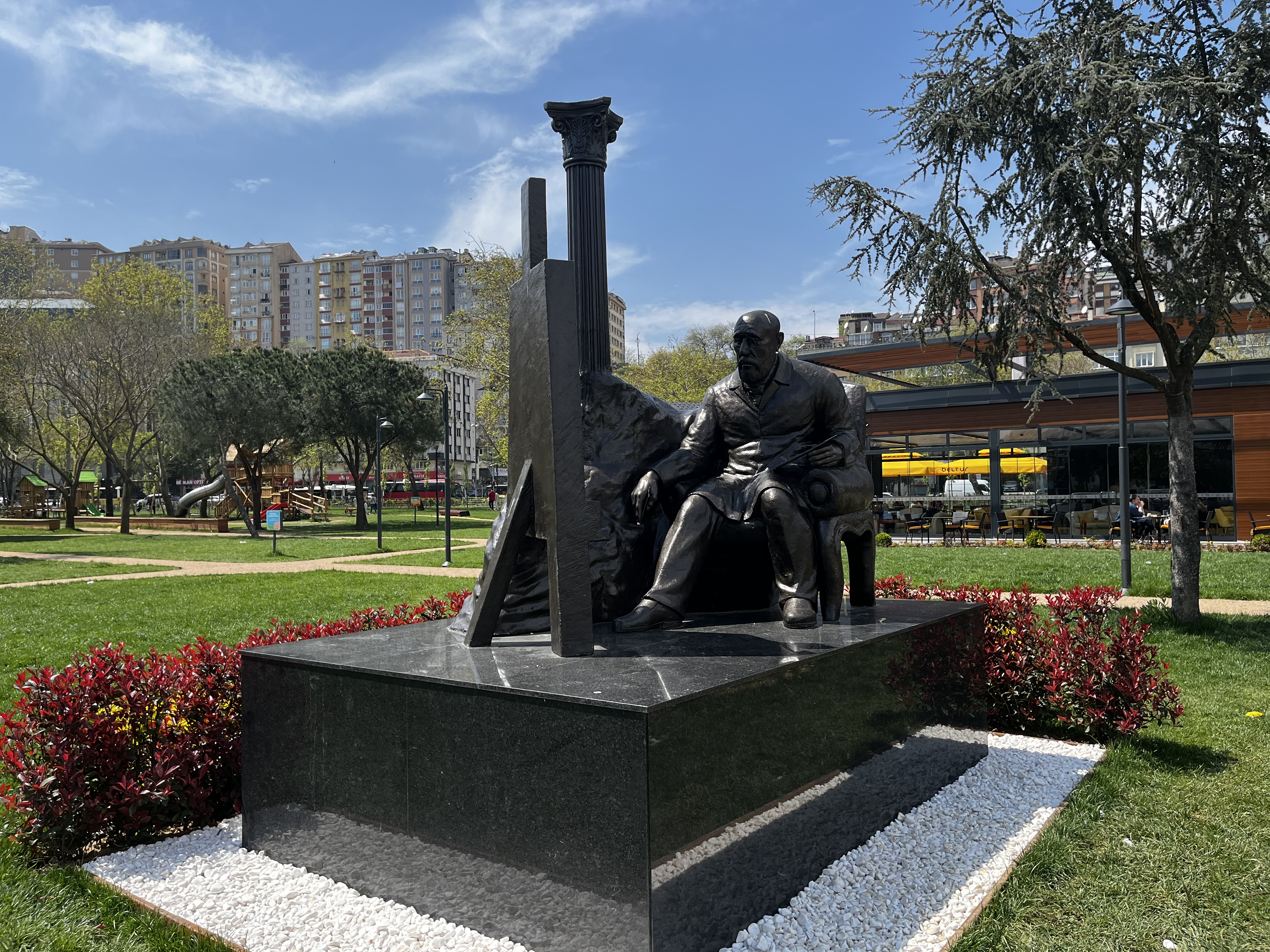
Osman Hamdi Bey Monument in Silahtarağa Youth Park, Istanbul

- His daughter Nazlı Hamdi (1893–1958) married an Ottoman diplomat, Esat Cemil Bey, in 1912; the couple had one daughter, Cenan Hamdi Sarç, who lived 99 years and died in 2012. Cenan Hamdi married Ömer Celal Sarç, who was the rector of Istanbul University in 1932. She had one son, Faruk Sarç, who was born in 1933. In 1932, Nazlı Hamdi married French engineer, Audoin Fouache d'Halloy (1889–1948).
- He was the brother of Halil Edhem Eldem, who became the Director of the Istanbul Archaeology Museums after his death, and served as a Member of Parliament at the Grand National Assembly of Turkey for ten years under the newly founded Turkish Republic.
- He was the brother of İsmail Galib Bey, considered the founder of numismatics as a scientific discipline in Turkey.
- He was the granduncle of Sedad Hakkı Eldem, a renowned Turkish architect.
- He was the granduncle of Cemal Reşit Rey, one of the five pioneers of classical music in Turkey (termed the Turkish Five).

== Documentary films ==
- Osman Hamdi Bey: Kaplumbağa Terbiyecisi ("Osman Hamdi Bey: The Tortoise Trainer") is a 2012 documentary film about the life and works of Osman Hamdi Bey, directed by Umut Hacıfevzioğlu.

== See also ==
- List of Orientalist artists
- Pascal Sébah
- Muhammad Khaznadar

== Biography ==
- Kaplumbağa Terbiyecisi, Osman Hamdi Bey' in Romanı, Emre Can, Kapı Yayınları, 2008.
- L'ammaestratore di Istanbul, Elettra Stamboulis & Gianluca Costantini, Comma 22, 2008.
- L'ammaestratore di Istanbul, Elettra Stamboulis & Gianluca Costantini, Giuda Edizioni, 2013.
- P. & V. BERKO, "Peinture Orientaliste – Orientalist Painting", Knokke-Heist Belgium, 1982.
