= Ibrahim Edhem Pasha =

Grand Vizier of the Ottoman Empire from 1877 to 1878

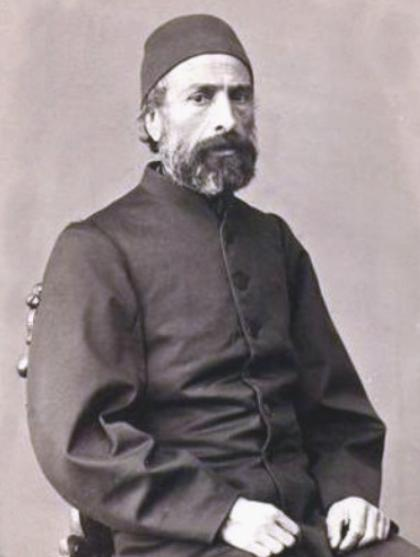
- Portrait by Abdullah Frères, c. 1877

Grand Vizier of the Ottoman Empire
- In office 5 February 1877 – 11 January 1878
- Preceded by: Midhat Pasha
- Succeeded by: Ahmed Hamdi Pasha

Ottoman Minister of the Interior
- In office 1883–1885

Ottoman Ambassador at Berlin
- In office 1876–1876

Ottoman Ambassador at Vienna
- In office 1879–1882

Personal details
- Born: 1819 Chios, Eyalet of the Archipelago, Ottoman Empire
- Died: 1893 (aged 73–74) Constantinople, Ottoman Empire

Ibrahim Edhem Pasha (Ottoman Turkish: ابراهيم ادهم پاشا; 1819–1893) was an Ottoman statesman, who held the office of Grand Vizier in the beginning of Abdul Hamid II's reign between 5 February 1877 and 11 January 1878. He resigned from that post after the Ottoman chances on winning the Russo-Turkish War (1877–1878) had decreased. He furthermore served numerous administrative positions in the Ottoman Empire including minister of foreign affairs in 1856, then ambassador to Berlin in 1876, and to Vienna from 1879 to 1882. He also served as a military engineer and as Minister of Interior from 1883 to 1885. In 1876–1877, he represented the Ottoman Government at the Constantinople Conference.

== Early life ==
He was born in Chios of Greek ancestry, in a Christian Greek Orthodox village on the island of Chios. His connection to Chios is not well-documented: his son Osman Hamdi Bey claimed that he was a member of the Skaramanga family, but Edhem Pasha himself tried to efface his Greek connections. Other proposed family origins include the Pyrikis family of Vessa, Chios, and the Kokkinos family, although his precise ancestry remains uncertain.

As a young boy in 1822, he was orphaned and captured by Ottoman soldiers during the massacre of the Greek population of Chios. He was sold into slavery, brought to Constantinople, and adopted by the (later) grand vizier Hüsrev Pasha. Lacking his own children and family, Hüsrev Pasha raised about ten children who had been orphaned or bought as slaves, many of whom ascended to important positions.

The child, now named İbrahim Edhem, quickly distinguished himself with his intelligence and after having attended schools in the Ottoman Empire, he was dispatched along with a number of his peers, and under the supervision of his foster father, then grand vizier, and of the sultan Mahmud II himself, to Paris to pursue his studies under state scholarship. There he returned a Bachelor of Arts, and was one of the top pupils at the École des Mines. He was a classmate and a friend of Louis Pasteur. He thus became Turkey's first mining engineer in the modern sense, and he started his career in this field.

== Family and legacy ==
Ibrahim Edhem Pasha was the father of Osman Hamdi Bey, a well-known archaeologist and painter, as well the founder of the Istanbul Archaeology Museum and the Mimar Sinan Fine Arts University. Another son, Halil Edhem Eldem took up the archaeology museum after Osman Hamdi Bey's death and had been a deputy for ten years under the newly founded Turkish Republic. Yet another son, İsmail Galib Bey, is considered as the founder of numismatics as a scientific discipline in Turkey. Later generations of the family also produced illustrious names. The architect Sedat Hakkı Eldem, a cousin, is one of the pillars of the search for modern architectural styles adopted by the Republic of Turkey (called the Republican style in the Turkish context) in its early years and which marks many important buildings dating from the period of the 1920s and the 1930s. A great-grandson, Burak Eldem, is a writer while another, Edhem Eldem, is a historian.

== See also ==
- List of Ottoman grand viziers
- Greek Muslims

Preceded by Midhat Pasha	Grand Vizier; 5 February 1877 - 11 January 1878	Succeeded by Ahmet Hamdi Pasha
