= Mihrab (painting) =

Painting by Osman Hamdi Bey

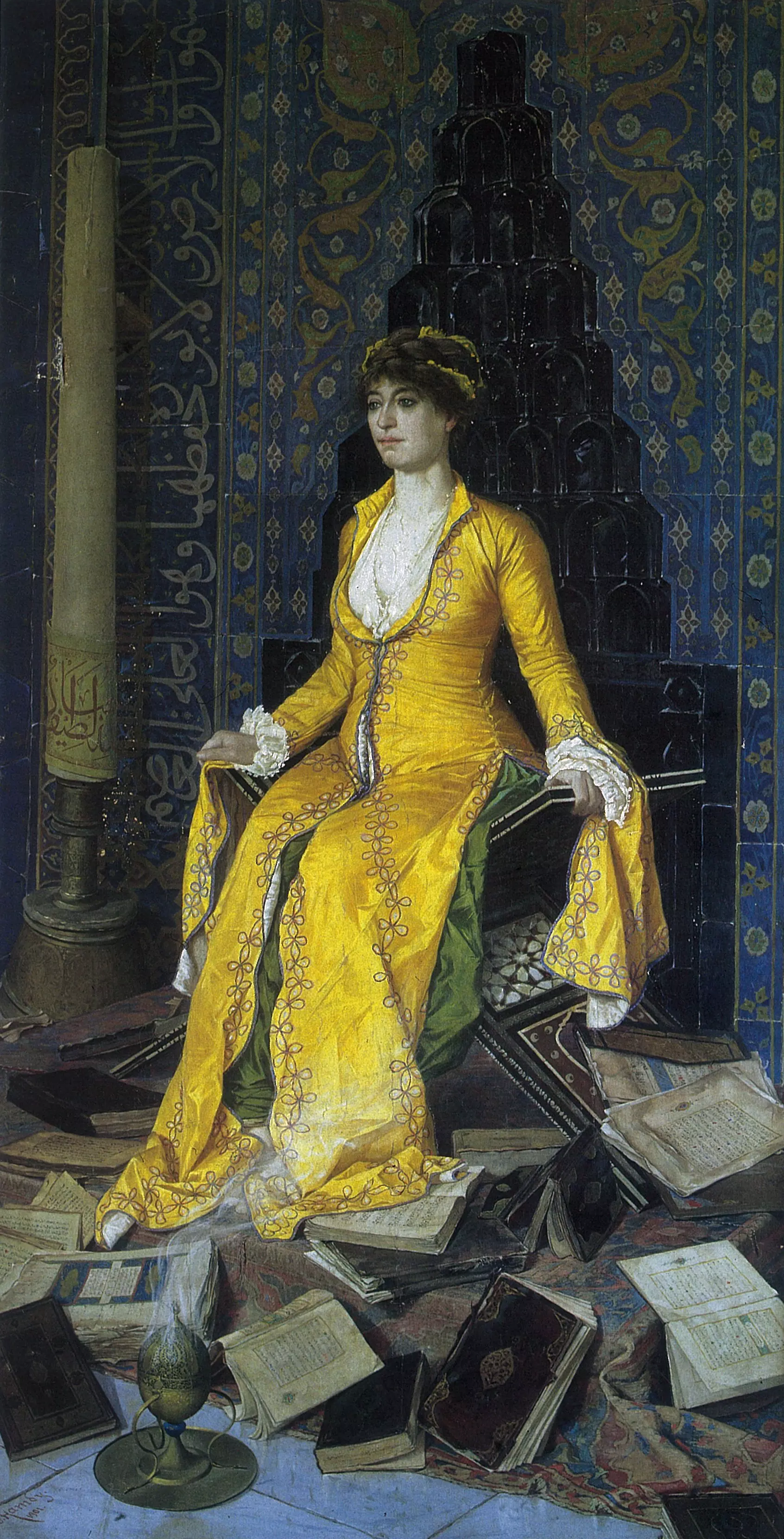
- Artist: Osman Hamdi Bey
- Year: 1901

Mihrab (Turkish: Mihrap), also known as Genesis (French: La Genèse) is a painting of 1901 by the Turkish artist Osman Hamdi Bey.

== History ==
The painting was first exhibited in May 1903 at the Royal Academy Exhibition in London under the French title La Genèse, which has been interpreted as a reference to the subject's possible pregnancy. It is unclear whether the name came from the organizers or Osman Hamdi Bey himself.

The present location of the painting is unknown.

== Description ==
The painting depicts a woman wearing a bright yellow décolleté dress and sitting on a Qur'an lectern. Behind the woman is a tiled mihrab (a niche indicating the direction of the Kaaba in Mecca). On the floor at her feet are several large religious books strewn around. There is an incense burner in the painting's foreground. The identity of the female figure is disputed: she has been variously identified as the painter's wife or his daughter Leyla. Mustafa Cezar, Osman's biographer, has also hypothesised that the model was the daughter of an Armenian housemaid.

== Analysis ==
The woman is sitting in the Rehal, where the Qur'an is usually placed; she has displaced the Qur'an and is now herself the focus of attention in this painting. She has also turned her back away from the prayer niche, and thus also has turned her back against Mecca, the holiest site in Islam.

This painting, like other paintings by Osman Hamdi Bey, comments on the museum culture of his time. All the items which we see surrounding the woman were part of the Ottoman Imperial Museum's collections. The museum collected religious items, but by doing so secularised them, making them into objects which are valued for their aesthetic rather than religious qualities.

The painting has also been seen as blasphemous, feminist and anti-Islam, as the woman is trampling over religious books and sitting where the Qur'an should be; as Edhem Eldem, a professor of history, says, "it is probably difficult to imagine a more offensive way of attacking the very foundations of Islamic tradition in the name of promoting female independence and autonomy".

== Sources ==
- Eldem, Edhem (2012). "Making sense of Osman Hamdi Bey and his paintings". Murnaqas. 29: 339–383. JSTOR 23350369.
- Shaw, Wendy (1999). "The Paintings of Osman Handi and the Subversion of Orientalist Vision". In Kafescioğlu, Çiğdem; Thys-Şenocak, Lucienne (eds.). Essays in Honour of Apatullah Kuran. Istanbul. ISBN 975-08-0061-3.
