= The Tortoise Trainer =

Painting by Osman Hamdi Bey

- Kaplumbağa Terbiyecisi (Turkish)
- Artist: Osman Hamdi Bey
- Year: 1906
- Medium: oil on canvas
- Dimensions: 221.5 cm × 120.0 cm (87.2 in × 47.24 in)
- Location: Pera Museum; Istanbul

The Tortoise Trainer (Turkish: Kaplumbağa Terbiyecisi) is a painting by Osman Hamdi Bey, with a first version created in 1906 and a second in 1907. Hamdi's painting of an anachronistic historical character attempting to train tortoises is usually interpreted as a satire on the slow and ineffective attempts at reforming the Ottoman Empire.

== Description ==
The painting depicts an elderly man in traditional Ottoman religious costume: a long red garment with embroidered hem, belted at the waist, and a Turkish turban. The figure may be a self-portrait of Hamdi himself. The anachronistic costume predates the introduction of the fez and the spread of Western style dress with the Tanzimat reforms in the mid-19th century. He holds a traditional ney flute and bears a nakkare drum on his back, with a drumstick hanging to his front. The man's costume and instruments suggests he may be a Dervish.

The scene is set in a dilapidated upper room at the Green Mosque, Bursa, where the man is attempting to "train" the five tortoises at his feet, but they are ignoring him preferring instead to eat the green leaves on the floor. Above a pointed window is the inscription: Şifa'al-kulûp lika'al Mahbub ("The healing of the hearts is meeting with the beloved").

== Versions ==
The first version of Hamdi's painting was exhibited at the Grand Palais in the 1906 Paris Salon, under the title L'homme aux Tortues ("Man with tortoises"). It was formerly in the collection of Turkish businessman Erol Aksoy. It was sold for US$3.5 million in 2004 and is currently displayed at the Pera Museum in Istanbul.

A second smaller version was completed in 1907, dedicated to his child's father-in-law, Salih Münir Pasha. The second version was bought by the journalist Erol Simavi in the 1980s, and was exhibited at the Sakıp Sabancı Museum in 2009.

Both may be inspired by an article that Hamdi read in the Le Tour du Monde travel journal decades before, which described Korean tortoise trainers in Japan, who trained their animals to walk in lines to the beat of a drum.

== Historic context ==
Osman Hamdi Bey created the painting at a time of great social and political turmoil in the Ottoman Empire. The reforms introduced by Sultan Abdülhamid II had either proved ineffective, or had been blamed for the increased upheaval. The Ottoman Empire, which still encompassed parts of the Balkan peninsula, parts of North Africa, all of Anatolia and the Levant, and much of the Arabian peninsula at the turn of the 20th century, was under serious threat from both the growing power of nationalist movements within its territory, and from the incursions of foreign powers which would eventually divide the Empire between them in the aftermath of the First World War.

Although not widely shown or understood at the time, the painting achieved greater significance in subsequent decades as it presaged the Young Turk Revolution of 1908 which brought an end to the direct autocratic rule by the Sultan (eventually replaced by the regime of the Three Pashas after the 1913 coup d'état) and set the stage for the Empire's entry into the First World War on the side of the Central Powers and for its subsequent partitioning.

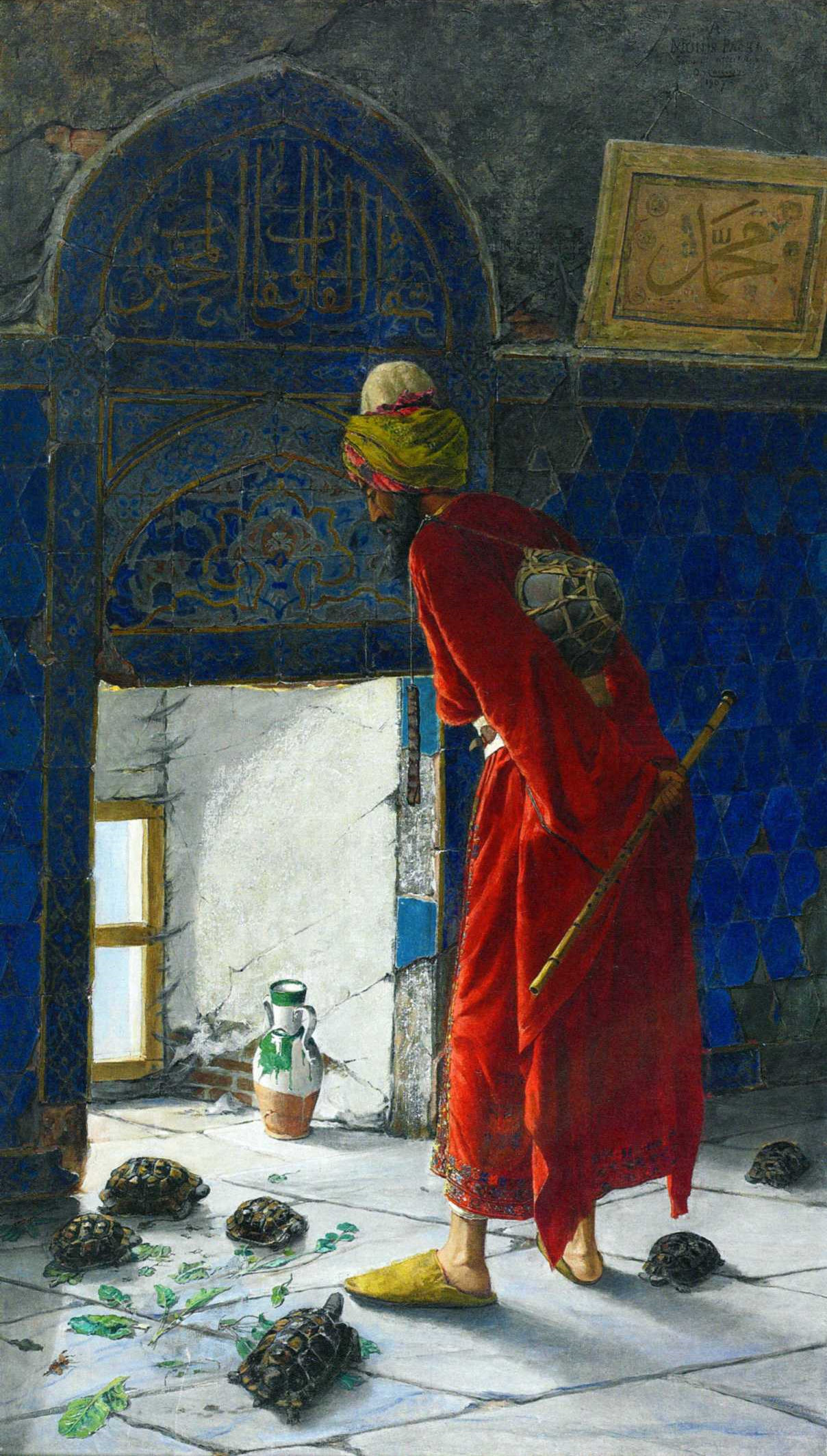
Second version, 1907, private collection

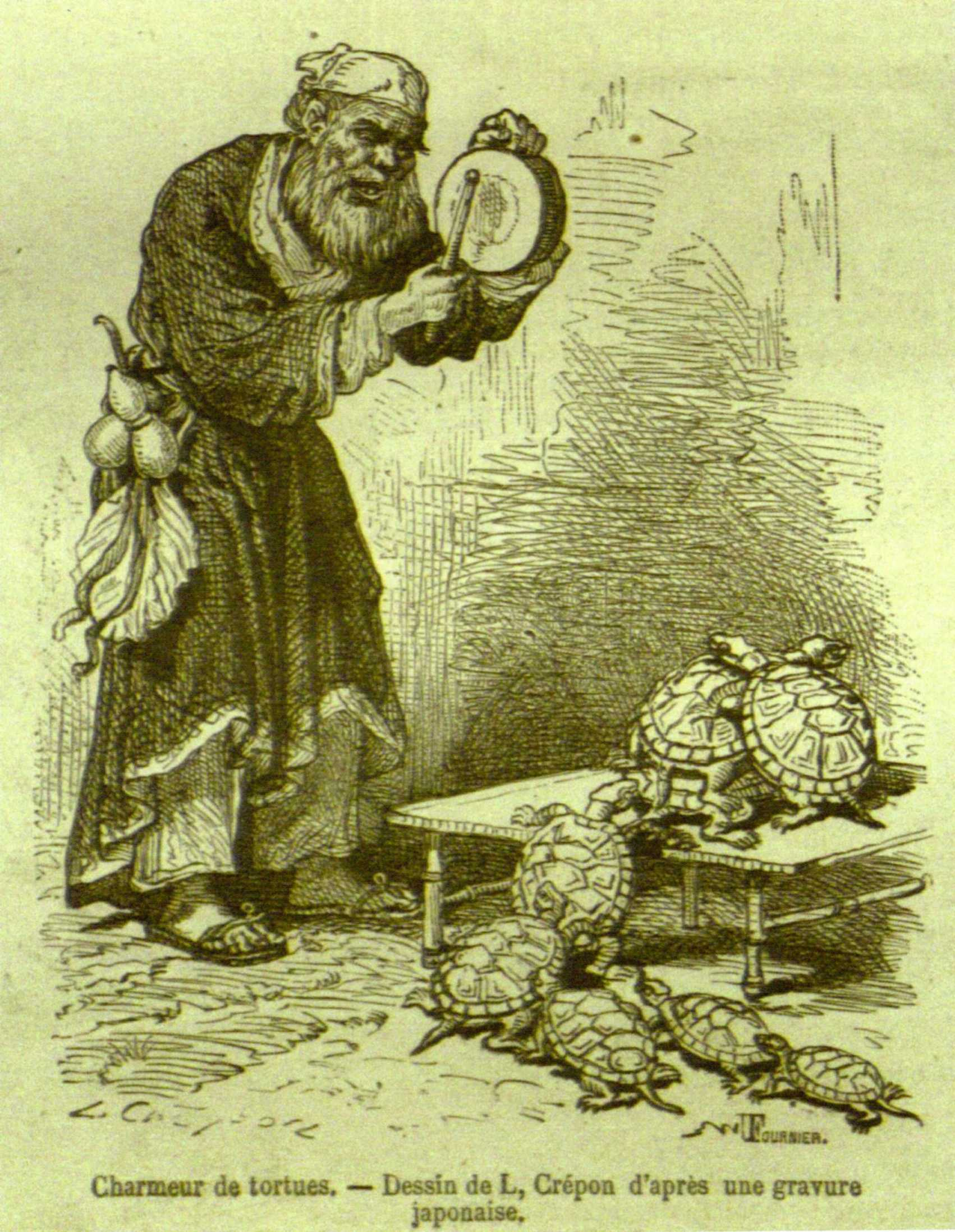
"Charmeur de tortues", in Le Tour du Monde, 1869
