= Edhem Eldem =

Turkish historian

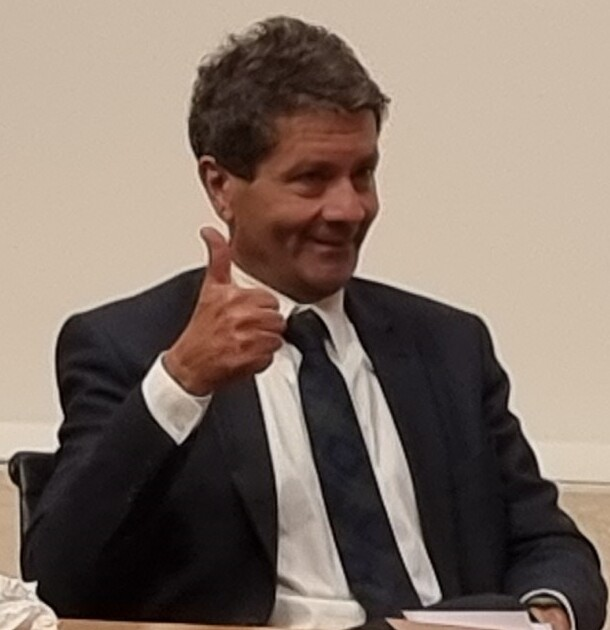
- Born: 2 March 1960 (age 66); Geneva, Switzerland
- Education: Lycée Saint-Joseph; Boğaziçi University (BA, MA); University of Provence (PhD)
- Partner: Sedef Eldem
- Children: Simin Eldem
- Awards: Légion d'honneur (2022)
- Scientific career
- Fields: Ottoman history, social history
- Workplaces: Boğaziçi University (1989-2024); Collège de France; Columbia University
- Thesis: French trade in Istanbul in the eighteenth century (1989)

Edhem Eldem (born March 2, 1960, Geneva) is a Turkish historian, author and academic.

== Early life and education ==
Edhem Eldem was born in Geneva, Switzerland in 1960. He completed his high school education at Lycée Saint-Joseph, Istanbul in 1977. In the same year, he was admitted to the Industrial Engineering Department of Boğaziçi University, but transferred to the Department of Political Science in 1979 and graduated in 1982.

After completing his master's degree in political science and public administration at the Boğaziçi University Faculty of Economics and Administrative Sciences between 1982 and 1983, he went to France with a scholarship from the French government and wrote his thesis "French Trade in Istanbul in the Eighteenth Century" under the advisory of Robert Mantran at the University of Provence. He received his Ph.D. degree in 1989.

== Career ==
Between 1982 and 1983, he worked as a research assistant at Boğaziçi University, Department of History. He worked as a researcher at the French Institute of Anatolian Studies. He was a lecturer in the Department of History at Boğaziçi University for six months in 1989, an assistant professor between 1989 and 1991, an associate professor between 1991 and 1998, and a professor between 1998 and 2024. Trustee rector Naci İnci’s management's mobbing pushed him to retire from Boğaziçi University.

He worked as a member of the executive board of the School of Arts and Sciences of Boğaziçi University between October 1991 and October 1994, a member of the coordination committee of the Boğaziçi University Summer School between April 1993 and September 1997, the Assistant Dean of the School of Arts and Sciences of Boğaziçi University between August 1994 and August 1998, the Assistant Chair of the Department of History of Boğaziçi University January 1995 and May 1998, a member of the executive board of the School of Arts and Sciences of Boğaziçi University between October 1998 and October 2001, the Director of the Institute for Graduate Studies in Social Sciences of Boğaziçi University between December 2004 and December 2007 and the Chair of the Department of History of Boğaziçi University between December 2005 and October 2011. In 2007, he was chosen for the Rostrum of International Turkish and Ottoman History of Collège de France and he did researches and gave conferences for five years. He worked as a guest lecturer at University of California, Berkeley (1999–2000), Harvard University (2009), LMU Munich (2015), Columbia University (2016) and Tokyo University of Foreign Studies (2017).

He did researches on late Ottoman social and economical history and archaeological history. His works include; A 135-Year-Old Treasure. Glimpses from the Past in the Ottoman Bank Archives, The History of the Ottoman Bank and the dictionary of Osman Hamdi Bey.

Eldem was among the founding members of the Turkish Social and Economic History Foundation in 1991. He was a member of the editorial board of Toplumsal Tarih magazine between 1994 and 2019. He served as an advisory board member at the Hrant Dink Foundation between 2010 and 2019. And also; He is an advisory board member of non-governmental organizations such as Studia Islamica, Bilim Akademisi (2018–present), Journal of the Royal Asiatic Society, Kingdom of Morocco Academy of Sciences (2023), Turcica (2015–present) and Turkic Studies Association.

In 2000, he was awarded the Sedat Simavi Social Sciences Award. In October 2022, due to his works and dedication to research, education and dialogue, he was appointed the Chèvalier of Legion of Honour.

== Personal life ==
His grandfather is İsmail Hakkı Eldem, who was an author and diplomat, and his father is Sadi Eldem, who was also a diplomat. Halil Ethem Eldem, who was a Turkish archeologist, and Osman Hamdi Bey are his maternal grandfather İsmail Galip Bey's brothers. His uncle is Sedad Hakkı Eldem, who was an architect. His mother is Rana Eldem, who is the daughter of Naciye Sultan, the daughter of Şehzade Süleyman Selim Efendi, son of Sultan Abdülmecid. He is married to Sedef Eldem and they have one child named Simin Eldem.

His native tongues are Turkish and French, but he is also fluent in English, Spanish, and Ottoman Turkish. He has a good understanding of Italian and Persian.
