= Alice Springs Reptile Centre =

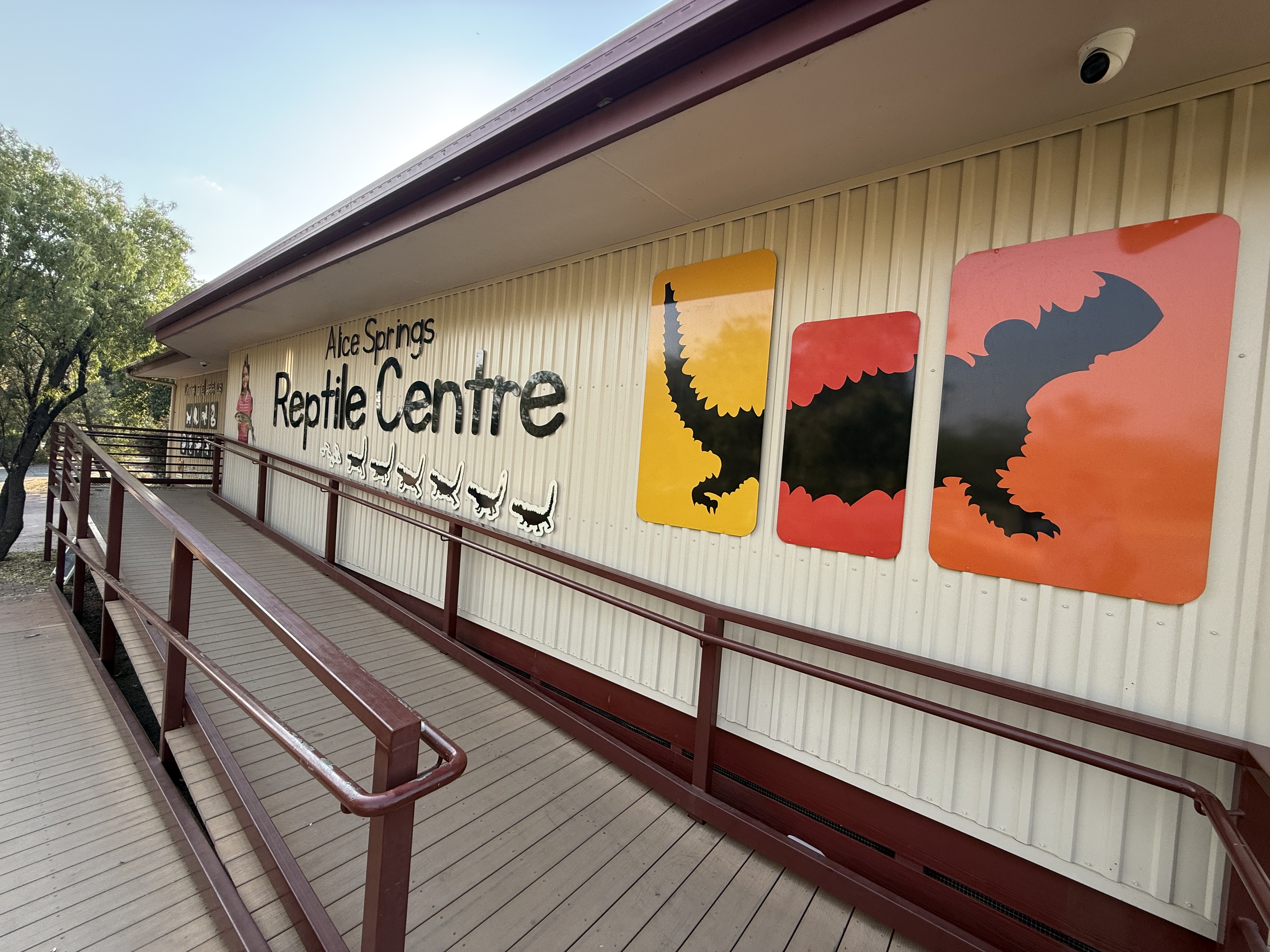
- Alice Springs Reptile Centre, October 2025
- Interactive map of Alice Springs Reptile Centre
- 23.7°S 133.87°E
- Date opened: January 2000
- Location: Alice Springs, Northern Territory, Australia
- Website: www.reptilecentre.com.au

The Alice Springs Reptile Centre is a privately operated reptile centre and environmental education facility in Alice Springs in the Northern Territory of Australia. It contains the largest collection of reptiles in the Northern Territory. Animals at the centre include the perentie, frill-necked lizards, thorny devils, large and small pythons and venomous snakes including inland taipans, brown snakes, death adders and king brown snakes. The centre is a popular tourist destination, particularly for children.

The centre is devoted to indigenous reptiles. Many are collected from local properties or from areas about to be burned under the controlled burning program to keep bushfires from threatening local homes. Most of the reptiles end up being relocated to uninhabited areas. The Alice Springs Reptile Centre also doubles as a snake call centre, with the owner and staff going out to homes to remove venomous snakes from places where they might inconvenience people.

== History ==
Founded by Rex Neindorf, a former reptile handler, the centre opened in January 2000, and features over 100 reptiles of 60 different species. Reptiles from the centre have featured in National Geographic Magazine, Wild Relations – Natural Born Cheats on ABC, an American Visa television commercial, New Zealand's The Bounty Hunters television show on TV2, Steve Irwin's Great Escapes on Discovery's Travel Channel and Animal Emergency on Channel 9 Australia. Directors including Frederic Lepage have filmed nature documentaries there.

The centre added a large saltwater crocodile exhibit in 2002, and in 2006 an extension funded by the Australian Tourism Development Program opened, featuring fossils which trace the evolution of reptiles from 200 million years ago to the present.

The centre is adjacent to Billy Goat Hill, which is on Crown land. After several incidents which saw reptiles in the centre killed, management sought to convince local police and the Lands Department to increase security on the hill – a spot frequented by youths and itinerant drinkers. Director of the centre, Rex Neindorf stated these efforts have been unsuccessful.

== Attacks on animals ==
=== 2004 ===
On 8 August 2004, a group of youths broke into the centre and attacked and bludgeoned a crocodile with a ladder and pool equipment. A 13-year-old boy was charged with the attack, and received a two-month suspended sentence and was placed on a good behaviour bond for two years, a sentence seen as overly lenient by the zoo's director. A second youth, a 12-year-old boy, had his six-month jail sentence reduced to a month on appeal. The crocodile suffered cuts and broken teeth, but survived.

=== 2008 ===
On 1 October 2008, a 7-year-old boy attacked animals at the centre. The boy, whose name was not released, was accused of breaking into the zoo while it was closed. He was captured on surveillance video, after jumping a fence at the rear of the zoo. 13 animals were killed, including a 20-year-old 5 feet 9 inches (1.75 m) Spencer's goanna, a turtle, bearded dragons, and thorny devils. Some of the animals were bludgeoned with a rock, and thrown over the fence to feed Terry, an 11 feet (3.4 m) 200 kilograms (440 lb) saltwater crocodile.

The attack lasted 30 minutes. After his arrest, the boy refused to cooperate with police. He was able to break in without tripping the alarm system, and was reported to be expressionless during the rampage. The animal species lost are said to be difficult to replace.

The attack was widely reported in the press, in countries including Australia, Canada, Finland, Tanzania, Zimbabwe, United Kingdom, United States, Italy, and many others. Under Northern Territory laws – which state children under the age of 10 cannot be held legally accountable for their actions – the 7-year-old boy is too young to be charged with a crime, but the zoo director indicated that he would seek to sue his parents. It was reported that the child's care arrangements were being urgently reviewed by the Northern Territory Government.
