= Snake Cell Andhra Pradesh =

Indian non-profit organisation

- Founded: 6 October 2009
- Type: Reptile Conservation
- Purpose: Environmentalism, Wildlife, Reptile Conservation, Snake rescue, Wildlife Crime Control
- Region served: Andhra Pradesh
- Key people: Regional Director, Head of Operations A.P Chapter
- Revenue: Private donations
- Volunteers: Around 190, 25 Active
- Website: snakecell.in
- Authorized by Andhra Pradesh Forest Department

Snake Cell Andhra Pradesh is a voluntary non-profit organisation working for the Conservation of Reptiles. It rescues snakes from residential areas of Hyderabad and Secunderabad.

== Organisation ==
Snake Cell is a voluntary organisation working for Conservation of Reptiles. It was started on 2009 and registered itself as an NGO (537/2009, AP/2009/0017904). The organisation is officially authorised by Andhra Pradesh Forest Department to carryout rescue operations and awareness programs in Andhra Pradesh. The primary activities of Snake Cell are rescuing snakes which stray into local residential communities and return them to their natural habitats. Other than engage in snake rescues, Snake Cell also facilitates awareness among the general public and educates students about facts, fallacies, misconceptions and myths about snakes.

A team of young animal welfare activists and students run the Snake Cell organisation. With a mission to save snakes, Snake Cell promotes wildlife conservation as a philosophy and a hobby. Since the organisation was founded, Snake Cell has successfully attempted to save over 1000 snakes and has educated thousands of people about issues related to snakes.

== Big Four Venomous Snakes ==
The Big Four are the four venomous snake species responsible for causing the most snake bite cases in South Asia (mostly in India).

The Big Four:

- Indian cobra, Naja naja, probably the most famous of all Indian snakes.
- Common krait, Bungarus caeruleus
- Russell's viper, Daboia russelii.
- Saw-scaled viper, Echis carinatus.
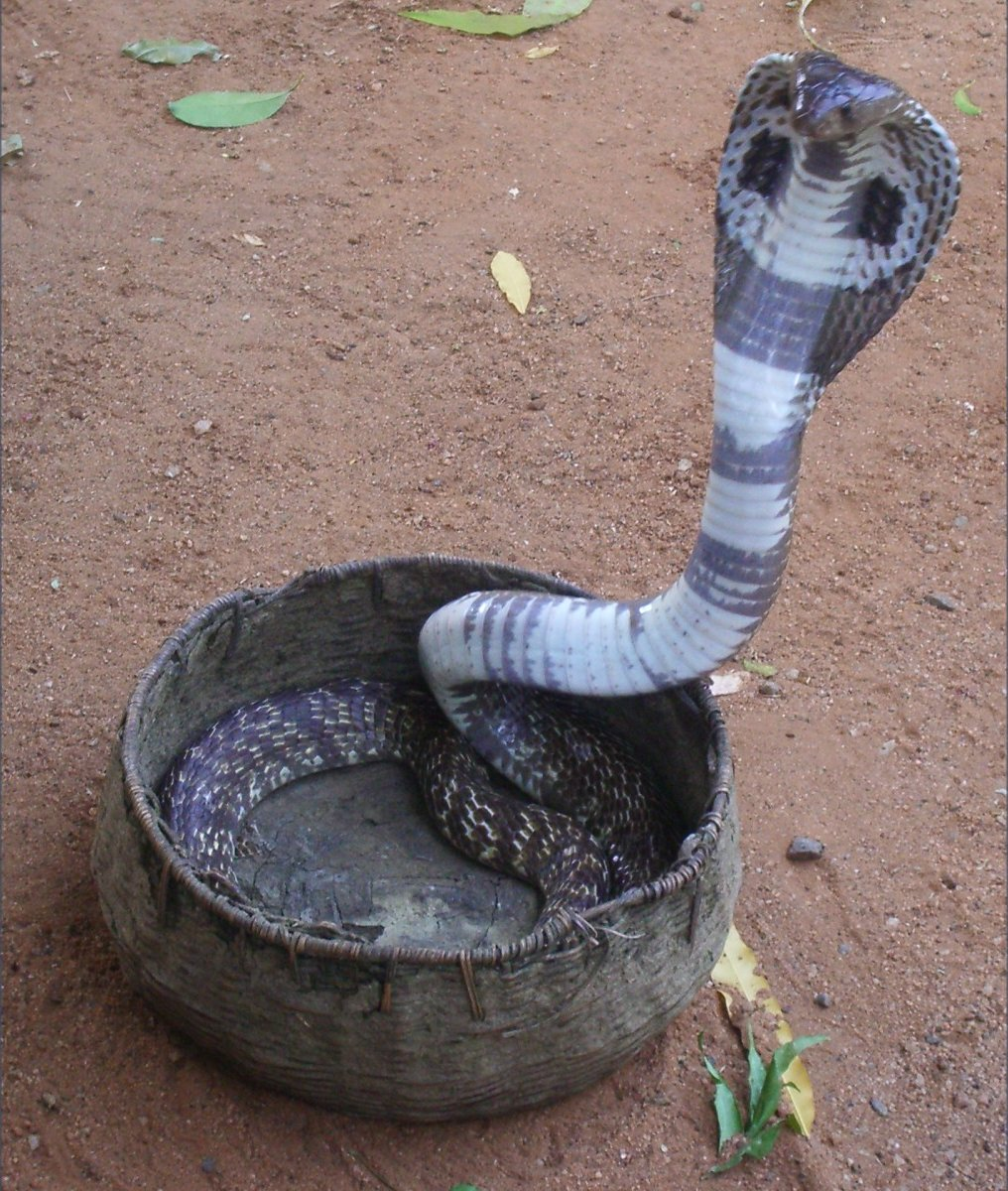
Naja naja, the spectacled cobra

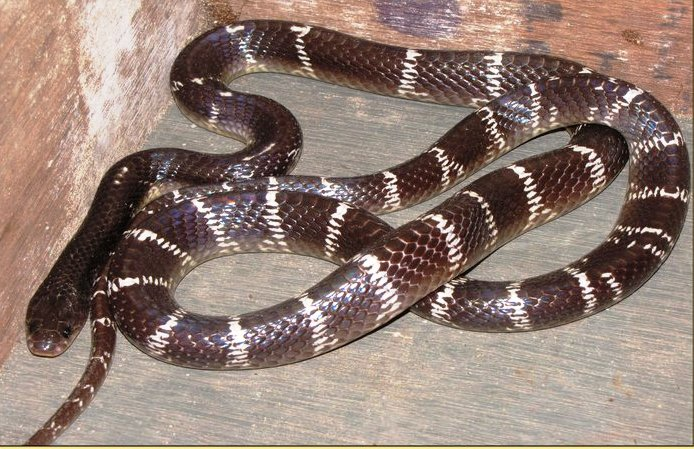
Bungarus caeruleus, the common krait

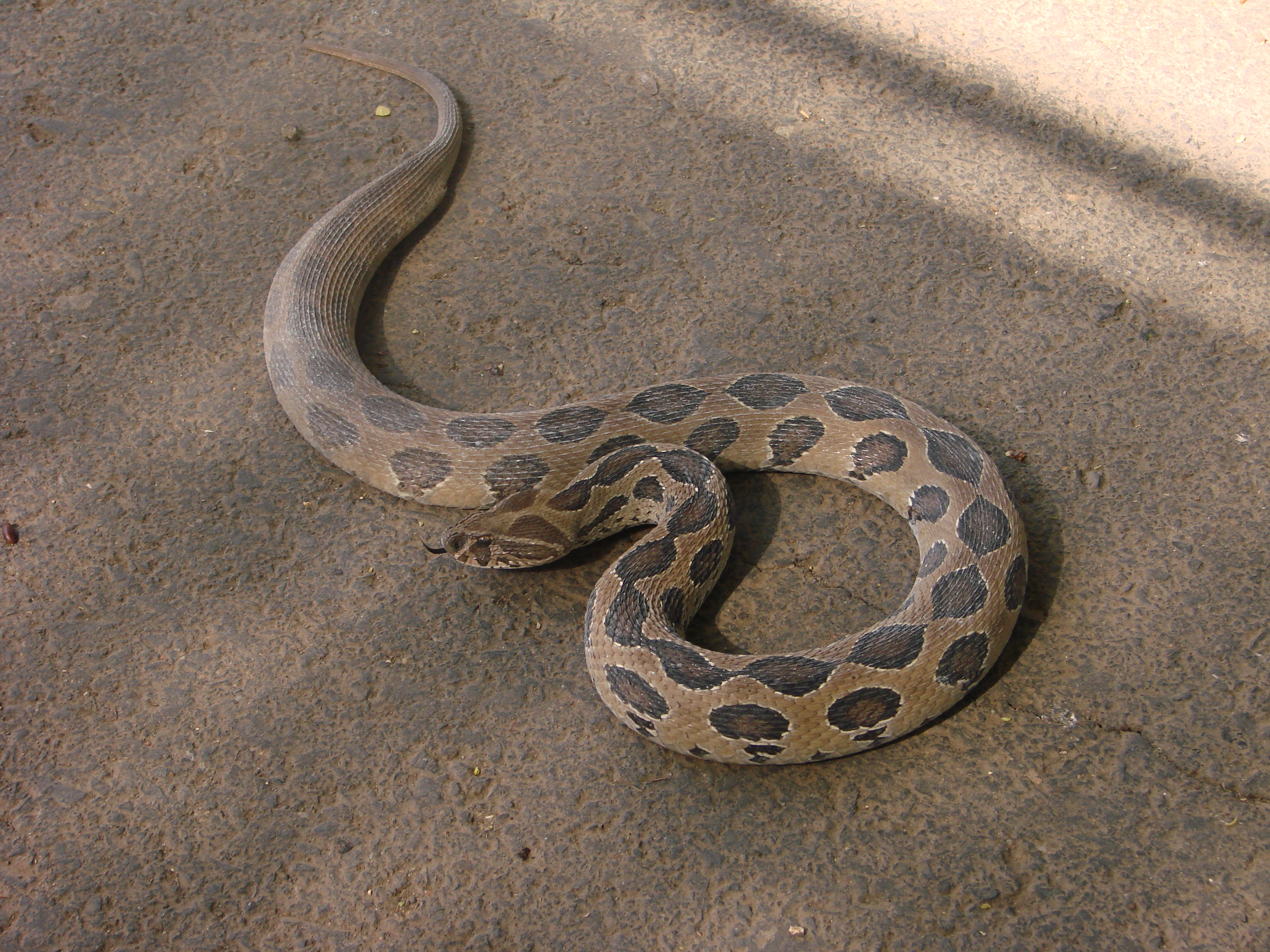
Daboia russelii, Russell's viper

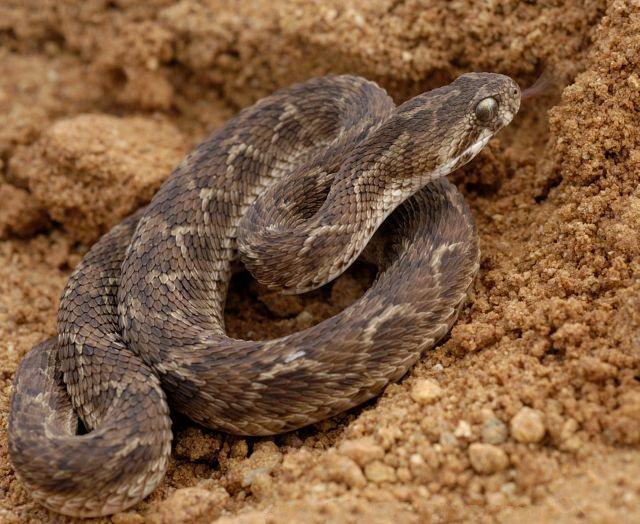
Echis carinatus, the saw-scaled viper

== Other venomous snakes in Andhra Pradesh ==
- King Cobra
- Bamboo Pit Viper
- Banded Krait
- Sea Snake

== Non-venomous snakes in Andhra Pradesh ==
- Common Worm Snake
- Indian Rock Python
- Eryx johnii
- Common Wolf Snake
- Barred wolf snake
- Banded Kukri Snake
- Striped Kukri Snake
- Buff Striped Keelback
- Green Keelback
- Checkered Keelback
- Olive Keelback
- Trinket Snake
- Rat Snake
- Banded Racer
- Bronzeback Tree Snake
- Asian whip snake
- Common Cat Snake
- Dumeril's Black-headed Snake
- Dog faced Water Snake
