= Burak Eldem =

Turkish writer/researcher, a former radio and TV programmer (born 1961)

Burak Eldem (born 1961) is a Turkish writer/researcher, a former radio and TV programmer, web developer and journalist. He is the author of "2012: Rendez-vous With Marduk" (also known as 2012: Appointment With Marduk - 2003), Fraternis: Lost Books, Secret Brotherhood (2006) and Talismans Protect Thee (2004). The first two titles belong to a trilogy about the history of civilization, which he named "The Hidden History". The latter is a science-fiction novel on immortality, ancient secrets and international conspiracies. His latest work Sunset Fandango, sequel to "Talismans", was published in November 2007.

== Early life and journalism ==
Eldem spent his early childhood in Ankara, the capital of Turkey. His father, Atilla Eldem, was a well-known actor of the Ankara State Theatre and his mother was a high school literature teacher. He is also a great-grandson of İbrahim Edhem Pasha, Grand Vizier (Sadrazam) of Ottoman Sultan Abdulhamid II. Eldem moved to Istanbul in 1975 when his father died and continued his high school education in this city. Graduated from Boğaziçi University's Tourism Management department and then Marmara University's Business Administration Faculty, but never intended to be a business executive; his main interests were writing and history.

His journalism career began in 1984, writing feature articles for Turkish arts and culture magazines; among them were "Gösteri", "Sanat Olayı" and "Milliyet Sanat", the most popular publications of the early eighties. His writings mostly concentrated on post-World War II counter-culture movements in Western World, particularly the avant-garde literature of the fifties and particularly in rock music. His colorful analysis on the Beat Generation literature and the Flower Power movement of the sixties, were welcomed by young urban intellectuals. In 1985, his first book was published by Imge Publications, titled "Bob Marley and Reggae"; a biography of Jamaican reggae star and a summary of the Rastafarian movement, slightly emphasising its politics, its elements of anti-imperialism. The same year he published "The History of Rock Music"; a research on the roots of jazz, blues and rock music, as a sociological and political phenomenon of the twentieth century capitalist world.

Eldem was among the founders of the monthly music and counter-culture magazine "Studyo Imge" (now considered as a cult) and became its first editor in early 1985. In 1986, his third book came: "From May Flower to the Song of Peace"; a work on American protest folk music of sixties, centered around the singer Joan Baez. The same year he began to write for the daily newspaper Cumhuriyet (The Republic) and became its one of the most popular freelance writers. In early 1988, he was hired for Playboy magazine's Turkish edition as the editorial director and ran that position until 1990. Between 1991 and 1996, he prepared and presented documentary music programs for Turkish television (TRT).

In 1997, he shifted his career towards "new media" working as a contributing editor and a columnist at ZDNet's Turkish edition; then in 2000, he became the portal manager of the leading internet content provider and ISP "Ixir". He also ran a personal web site named "Atlantis", where he shared his research on humanities and particularly on ancient history.

== Researcher and novelist ==
Eldem has published dozens of articles and essays on archaeo-astronomy, along with unorthodox interpretations of sacred texts and papyri. His writings on ancient Mesopotamian cosmology and Mayan astronomy eventually became the basis and nucleus of a trilogy, named "The Hidden History". The first volume was published in 2003: the best-selling "2012: Rendez-vous With Marduk".

Examining, adapting and developing the work of Zecharia Sitchin, the book refers to the hypothetical Planet X, and suggests an orbital period of 3661 solar years with a return date in 2012. Eldem also suggests that the number 3661 was written as "three wedges" with cuneiform in Mesopotamian sexagesimal mathematics: One wedge each for 3600's, 60's and units digits. This cuneiform sign, claims Eldem, was misinterpreted by Jewish exiles in Babylon and the enigmatic 666 was created: the Number of the Beast was actually the number of solar years in Marduk's orbital period.

The book became a best-seller in Turkey in 2004 and Eldem was criticized by religious writers for being an atheist, denying the Old Testament prophets such as Moses, promoting the theory of evolution, accusing Moses and Aaron of inventing the concept of God in order to reassure themselves following natural disasters such as floods.

On the other hand, his works had very positive critics from some of the outstanding writers and journalists of the Turkish Press, like Engin Ardıç and Serdar Turgut, the editor-in-chief of daily newspaper Akşam (The Evening). Ardıç, a very popular writer, columnist and former TV commentator, also contributed to "2012: Rendez-vous With Marduk" by writing its foreword.

The same year came his first novel, Seni Tılsımlar Korur "Talismans Protect Thee"; a semi-fantastic fiction on immortality, a five thousand years old dark secret which had been hidden from humanity, a dark international conspiracy and a top secret research on human DNA. "Talismans" became one of the best-selling novels of 2005 in Turkey.

Eldem's second book of "The Hidden History" trilogy, Fraternis: Lost Books, Secret Brotherhood was published in April 2006. "Fraternis" focuses on alleged lost records of ancient wisdom; a mysterious, legendary collection of writings, traces of which he says can be found under various names like "The Sibylline Books", "Corpus Hermetica" or "The Lost Books of Phoenicians".

Eldem prepared an eight-days article series in April 2005 for the daily newspaper Akşam, which presented a mini summary of "2012: Rendez-vous With Marduk". Since then, he publishes his articles only at his official website and once in a month contributes to the online magazine "Derki".

== See also ==
- ZetaTalk
