= İsmail Galib =

Ottoman numismatist

İsmail Galib (1860-1950) was the son of İbrahim Edhem Pasha and a notable numismatist in the Ottoman Empire, studying coins from the Sultanate of Rum. He is considered the father of modern numismatics in Turkey.

== Works ==
1. Takvîm-i Meskükât-ı Selçukiye. (Catalogue of Seljuq Coins)
2. Takvîm-i Meskükât-ı Osmaniyye. (Catalogue of Ottoman Coins)
