= Halil Edhem Eldem =

Turkish archaeologist (1861–1938)

Halil Edhem Bey
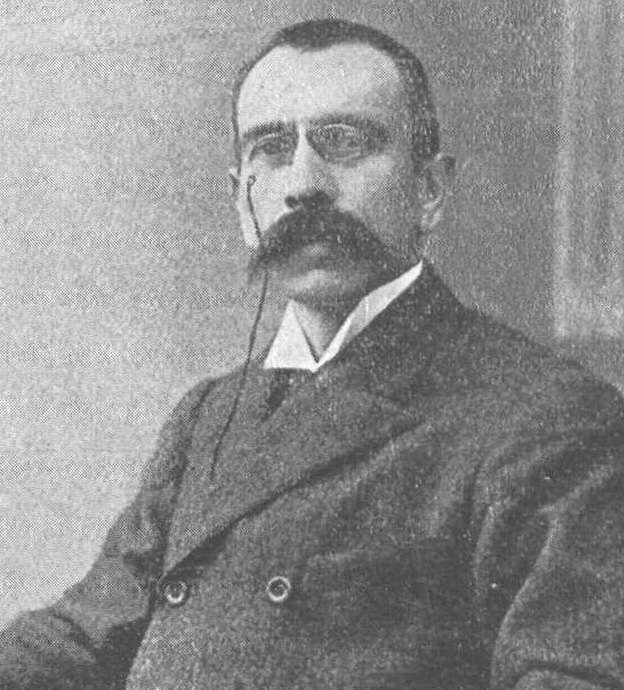

Personal details
- Born: 1861
- Died: 1938 (aged 76–77)

Halil Edhem Eldem, also known as Halil Edhem Bey (1861–1938) was an Ottoman conservative politician, archaeologist and writer during the Second Constitutional Era. He was the son of Ibrahim Edhem Pasha and brother of Osman Hamdi Bey.
