= Olive keelback =

There are three species of snake named olive keelback:

- Atretium schistosum, olive keelback wart snake
- Trimerodytes percarinatus, species in the subfamily Natricinae
- Helicops modestus, species in the subfamily Dipsadinae
