= Reptile centre =

Facility for the care and display of reptiles

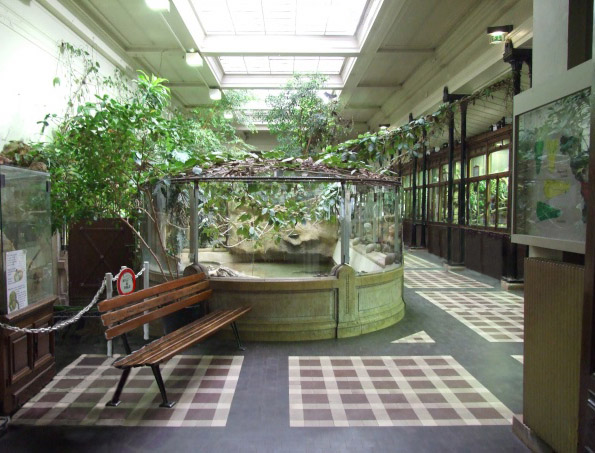
Reptile center at the Muséum National d'Histoire Naturelle in Paris

A reptile center is typically a facility devoted to keeping living reptiles, educating the public about reptiles, and serving as a control center for collecting reptiles that turn up in populated areas, where they will then help to rehabilitate some reptiles before returning them to the wild. Most are public-access, run as private businesses, or are state-sponsored. Some centers work with venomous reptiles as venom research labs. Others are simply privately run zoos devoted solely to reptiles, or are incorporated into larger zoos or organizations.

One example is the reptile center in Alice Springs, Australia devoted to indigenous reptiles. Many are collected from local homes, yards, or from areas about to be burned under the controlled burning program to keep summer grass fires from threatening the local homes. Most of the reptiles end up being relocated to uninhabited areas. The Alice Springs center also doubles as a snake call centre, with the owner and staff coming out to homes to remove venomous snakes from inconvenient places.

The United States of America has the world's largest collection of reptiles and reptile centers, with a lot of the states in the South hosting the majority of them. In Punta Gorda, Florida, Iguanaland is the nation's largest collection of reptiles and amphibians, with over two hundred fifty species. It first opened in 2022. A close second is Black Hills Reptile Gardens located in Rapid City, South Dakota. Founded in 1937, it is located in the heart of the Black Hills and has over two hundred twenty-five species. The St. Augustine Alligator Farm Zoological Park is the only complete collection of the world's crocodilians. In 1893, the park started as a small facility, displaying the American Alligator. It was accredited with the AZA (Association of Zoos and Aquariums) in 1989.

A renowned privately-owned reptile center is located in Fountain Valley, California called the Reptile Zoo. It has a significant social media following, as well as over a hundred species housed within its facility, which includes amphibians, fish, and arachnids.

The United States also holds some of the world's records for which specific species can be found in reptile centers, as well as particular feats that those reptiles have achieved. For example, a Burmese python at the reptile center Serpent Safari in Gurnee, Illinois was billed as the heaviest living snake in captivity. In 2005, it weighed 183 kilograms (403 lb) at a length of 8.2 metres (27 ft). The snake was named Baby. Zoo Atlanta in Atlanta, Georgia is home to one of the rarest breeds of lizards on the planet called the Guatemalan beaded lizard. Outside of Guatemala, Zoo Atlanta is the only organization in the entire world that breeds them.

Outside of the United States, the largest reptile centers are notably Reptiland in Martel, France and Reptilia in Vaughan, Canada. Reptilland features a large collection of venomous snakes and foreign species, such as crocodiles, cobras, and chameleons. It was opened in 1990. Reptilia opened in 1996 and began as a small reptile pet store, then later expanded into a major zoo. A facility within the United States that deals with venomous snakes is the Reptile Discovery Center in Volusia County, Florida, where they put on venom extraction presentations and house both local and exotic snakes.

== See also ==
- Herpetarium
- Reptilia (zoo)
