= Bibliotheca Herpetologica =

- Discipline: Herpetology, history of science
- Language: English
- Edited by: Christofer J. Bell

Publication details
- Former names: International Society for the History and Bibliography of Herpetology Newsletter and Bulletin
- History: 1999–present
- Publisher: International Society for the History and Bibliography of Herpetology
- Frequency: Biannually

Standard abbreviations
- ISO 4: Bibl. Herpetol.

Indexing
- ISSN: 1404-3815
- OCLC no.: 43962532

Links
- Journal homepage

Bibliotheca Herpetologica: A Journal of the History and Bibliography of Herpetology is a biannual peer-reviewed scientific journal covering the history of herpetology and its bibliography. It is published by the [International Society for the History and Bibliography of Herpetology]. The journal was established in May 1999 as the International Society for the History and Bibliography of Herpetology Newsletter and Bulletin and obtained its current title in 2005 (volume 5, issue 2). The editor-in-chief is Christopher J. Bell (University of Texas at Austin). The journal is abstracted and indexed in The Zoological Record.
