= Nile Expedition =

Failed rescue mission

- Part of the Mahdist War
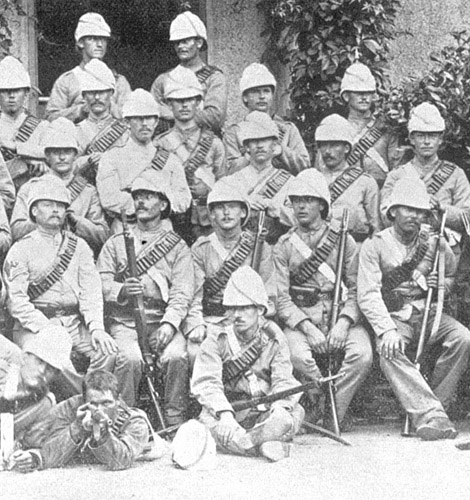
- 11th Hussars from the Gordon Relief Expedition
Date	14 September 1884 – 17 April 1885
Location	Sudan (primarily along the Nile River and Bayuda Desert)
Result	Mahdist victory

Belligerents
United Kingdom: Khedivate of Egypt; Canada	Mahdist State

Commanders and leaders
(United Kingdom) Sir Garnet Wolseley: (United Kingdom) Herbert Stewart (Desert Column); (United Kingdom) Charles William Wilson	(Mahdist State) Muhammad Ahmad

Strength
9,000 British soldiers 400 Canadian boatmen / voyageurs	14,000 (at Battle of Abu Klea); 13,000–14,000 (at Battle of Abu Kru); 30,000–50,000 (at Siege of Khartoum)

Casualties and losses
~500+ killed, wounded, or died of disease	Several thousand (estimated)

The Nile Expedition, sometimes called the Gordon Relief Expedition (1884–1885), was a British mission to relieve Major-General Charles George Gordon at Khartoum, Sudan. Gordon had been sent to Sudan to help the Egyptians withdraw their garrisons after the British decided to abandon Sudan in the face of a rebellion led by self-proclaimed Mahdi, Mahommed Ahmed. A contingent of Canadians was recruited to help the British navigate their small boats up the Nile River. The Nile Expedition was the first overseas expedition by Canadians in a British imperial conflict, although the Nile Voyageurs were civilian employees and did not wear uniforms.

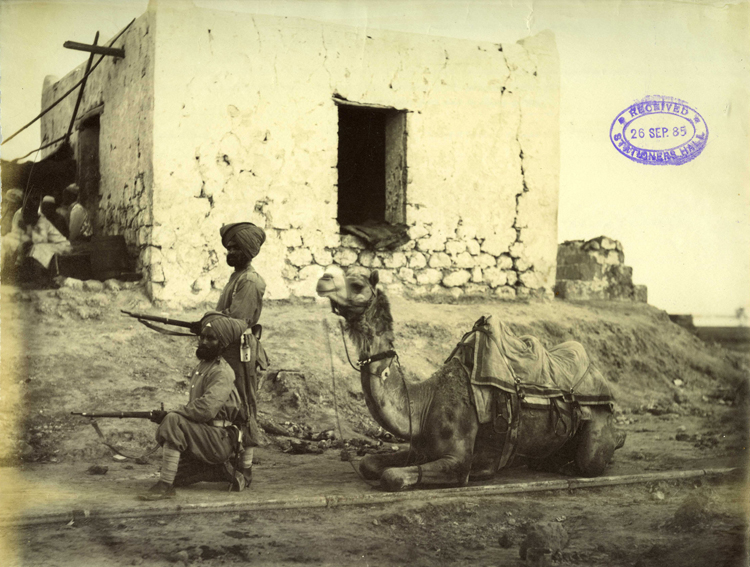
Photograph of Camel Corps, 2 Sikhs at the 'Ready'. Photograph by Felice Beato, 1884/85.

The expedition was commanded by Garnet Wolseley, who instructed Herbert Stewart to take command of an advance party of about 1,800 British soldiers and 350 native auxiliaries through the Bayuda Desert by camel and horse. This force became known as the Desert Column. After Stewart was mortally wounded, Charles William Wilson took over command. A small part of Wilson's Desert Column reached Khartoum on two Nile steamers in the afternoon of 28 January 1885. It came two days too late: Khartoum had been seized by the Mahdists in the early hours of 26 January. The entire garrison, along with Gordon and 4,000 civilians had been killed.

Wilson received criticism afterwards for his delay in sailing to Khartoum, with Wolseley stating that Wilson had "lost any nerve he had ever possessed". Other sources however, spread the blame, particularly on Wolseley. The public in England also blamed Prime Minister William Gladstone for not having taken steps to relieve the siege of Khartoum and some historians have held Major-General Gordon responsible, because he had refused the order to evacuate while it was still possible.

== Background ==
Not wanting to be involved in the costly suppression of the rebellion led by Mahommed Ahmed, the United Kingdom of Great Britain and Ireland ordered Egypt to abandon its administration of Sudan in December 1883. The British government asked General Gordon, former Governor-General of Sudan, to go to Khartoum and aid in the evacuation of Egyptian soldiers, civilian employees and their families. Travelling from London, General Gordon reached Khartoum on 18 February 1884. He immediately began sending women, children and wounded soldiers back to Egypt as the military situation deteriorated in Sudan with the south of the country being in danger of being cut off from Egypt by the Mahdist army. Britain withdrew its troops from Sudan until Khartoum was the last remaining outpost under British control.

Gordon differed with the British government's decision to abandon the Sudan. He thought that the Mahdists had to be crushed for fear that they might eventually overwhelm Egypt. He based this on Muhammad Ahmad's claim of dominion over all Islamic lands. Defying orders from the British government to withdraw, General Gordon, leading a garrison of 7,000 men, began the defence of Khartoum. On 18 March 1884, the Mahdist army laid siege to the city. The rebels stopped river traffic and cut the telegraph line to Cairo. Khartoum was cut off from resupply, which led to food shortages, but could still communicate with the outside world by using messengers. Under pressure from the public, in August 1884, the British government decided to reverse its policy and send a relief force to Khartoum.

== Organising the Relief Force ==
The Expedition was put under the command of General Garnet Wolseley, who had seen service in the Crimean War, Canada, the Gold Coast and the South African Wars. The Expedition was composed of two officers and 43 soldiers from each British Light Cavalry Regiment.

Wolseley decided that the best way of reaching Khartoum would be to ascend the Nile. Based on his favourable experience with them during his expedition along the Red River to Fort Garry (now Winnipeg) from 1869–1870 to suppress the Red River Rebellion, Wolseley asked the Governor General of Canada, the Marquess of Lansdowne, if it would be possible to recruit a contingent of Canadian voyageurs to help him navigate the Nile. He requested that they be commanded by Lieutenant-Colonel Frederick C. Denison, who had served as Wolseley's aide-de-camp during the Red River expedition. The Prime Minister of Canada, John A. Macdonald, did not object once he was assured that the voyageurs were volunteers and would be paid by the British. Denison complied and on 14 September 1884, a Canadian force of almost 400 voyageurs and others left Montreal for Egypt to take part in the Nile Expedition.

The Canadians were known at the time as the Nile Voyageurs. As the traditional role of the voyageur was waning, most were formerly employed helping transport log booms down rivers such as the Ottawa, Gatineau and Saguenay.

Eighty-six of the voyageurs were members of the First Nations, mostly Caughnawaga, coming from a Mohawk community near Montréal, Québec.

== The expedition ==
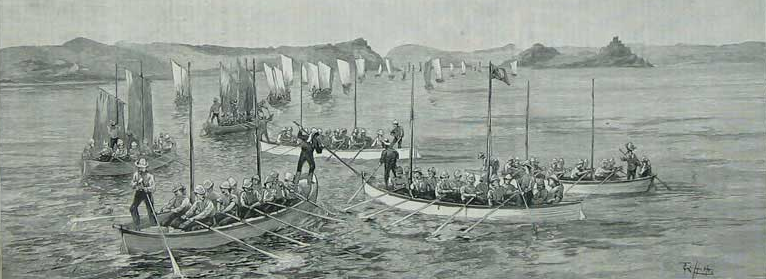
The Nile Expedition for the relief of Gordon

On 7 October 1884, the Canadians reached Alexandria by sailing ship and headed up the Nile by a combination of shallow draft steam launch and train. On 26 October 1884, the Canadians met Wolseley and his force of 9,000 soldiers at Wadi Halfa. By November the combined force were at the first of six cataracts and began to ascend the rapids. The southward progress of the expedition sped up with the experienced voyageurs manning the boats. The boats that Wolseley selected were modified Royal Navy whalers. They were almost 10 metres (33 ft) long, 2 metres (6 ft 7 in) wide and .75 metres (2 ft 6 in) deep, and were equipped with twelve oars, two masts and a removable rudder. The boats had the capacity for a dozen men along with enough cargo to supply them for a hundred days.

In mid-November, the expedition received word from General Gordon that he could only survive the siege for another forty days. Realising that time was running out for General Gordon in Khartoum, Wolseley split his force into two columns. He sent the Desert Column by camel on a 280 km shortcut from Korti, across the Bayuda Desert to Metemma where they would link with Gordon's steamboats awaiting them (avoiding the Great Bend of the Nile). General Herbert Stewart led the Desert Column which was composed of 1,800 British soldiers, 350 native auxiliaries, 2,900 camels, 150 horses and three 7-pounder guns. The Desert Column was attacked by Mahdists at Abu Klea and Abu Kru. The column repelled the rebel attacks both times but Stewart was mortally wounded. Command was passed on to General Charles William Wilson and the column reached the Nile near Metemma where they linked with Gordon's steamboats.

The remaining 7,200 soldiers and 400 voyageurs continued up the river. Progress up the river was slow, and often the boats had to be pulled through rapids by rope from shore. At several places the strength of the current necessitated several crews pulling one boat. They settled on a method of stationing the voyageurs at difficult stretches along the river, so that each group would become familiar with a particular stretch of water.

The Canadians' six-month contracts were soon to expire, and they were asked to re-enlist. Though offered generous inducements, only 86 of the voyageurs, including their commander, Denison, signed up for a second six-month contract. The rest elected to return to Canada, hoping to arrive in time for the spring logging season. This did not halt the expedition, as the worst of the river was already behind them and the smaller number of soldiers travelling by river reduced the need for the Canadians. Denison and his men continued piloting the small boats up the river.

General Gordon's last entry in his journal, dated 14 December 1884, read, "Now mark this, if the Expeditionary Force, and I ask for no more than 200 men, does not come in ten days, the town may fall; and I have done my best for the honour of our country. Good bye."

On 26 January 1885, Khartoum fell to the Mahdist army of 50,000 men. At that time of year the Nile was shallow enough to be forded and the Mahdists were able to breach the city's defences by attacking the poorly-defended approaches from the river. The entire garrison was slaughtered, including General Gordon. His head was cut off and delivered to Muhammad Ahmad.

Two days later, two of Gordon's armed steamers – the Bordein and the Talahawiyeh – towing several native boats and carrying some 240 British and native troops including 24 men from the Royal Sussex Regiment, came within sight of the city. Dismayed at the sight of the city's fall, Wilson ordered his flotilla to turn about and steam back down river to Metemma. It was the closest the relief column would get to Khartoum.

== After the fall of Khartoum ==
Emboldened by their victory at the Siege of Khartoum, the Mahdists resisted British efforts to force the Nile. This included, on 10 February 1885, the Mahdists defending a fortified site at Kirbekan they hoped would impede the main British column still ascending the river. These military operations were occurring some two weeks after the fall of Khartoum and Brigadier Wilson's earlier glimpse of the fallen city from his steamship. At Kirbekan, whilst the British successfully seized the position, the British commander General William Earle was killed near the end of the attack.

The fall of Khartoum and the massacre of all within led to various communiques between Wolseley and London. Indicative of the confusion, on 7 February 1885, three days before the battle of Kirbekan, Wolseley was told by London to make no retrograde steps down the Nile to Egypt. Wolseley himself, however, was concerned that with the fall of Khartoum, he lacked sufficient military force to subdue Muhammad Ahmad. This led to consideration of an operational pause, to last several months over the Sudanese summer, which might allow fresh British reinforcements to be assembled in Egypt and later sent up the river to Wolseley.

The Panjdeh incident of 29 March 1885, initiated by Imperial Russia in south-central Asia, gave the British government sufficient excuse to make a face-saving withdrawal of the Wolseley force to Egypt and then home, thereby ending any further commitment to the region, including on the coast at Suakin. With the fall of Khartoum and now the subsequent removal of the last British troops in the vicinity of the upper Nile, Muhammad Ahmad controlled the whole of Sudan, allowing him to establish an Islamic state governed by Sharia law. He died less than six months later. His state survived him, but Sudan was re-conquered by the British in a campaign from 1895 to 1898, led by Lord Kitchener.

== Legacy ==
On 17 April 1885, the Canadian contingent set sail from Alexandria for home. Sixteen Canadians had died on the expedition. They are memorialised in Canada's Peace Tower, which recognises all of Canada's war dead. Wolseley wrote a letter to the Governor General of Canada praising the Canadians' service and the British Parliament passed a motion thanking them for their efforts.

A collection of records from the expedition was compiled and edited by C.P. Stacey, and published by the Champlain Society in 1959.

Among the journalists who covered the expedition was Charles Lewis Shaw who worked for the Winnipeg Times and published an account in his book Nile Voyageur.

A memorial plaque "Nile Voyageurs 1884–85" was erected at Kitchissippi Lookout on Island Park Drive just west of the Champlain Bridge in 1966.

The Nile Expedition, and concern for the welfare of Army wives and children at home, led directly to the intervention of Major James Gildea of the Royal Warwickshire Regiment, who wrote a forceful letter to The Times in February 1885 appealing for funds and volunteers to look after unfortunate families left behind. A fund was set up to provide allowances and SSAFA, the Armed Forces charity was founded.

== Assessment ==
Joseph Moretz, a Royal Navy historian, faults Wolesley for the expedition's failure. Although there were structural problems with the Army's command and political hesitancy in Gladstone's government that the general could do nothing about, many of the decisions on the ground were his. While there were sound reasons to reject the plan to attack both by sailing down the river and by building a rail link from Suakin to Berber, particularly the cost and the lack of a surveyed route for the latter, it would have forced Muhammad Ahmad to defend on two fronts. Moretz, in a chapter of the 2022 anthology The Worst Military Leaders in History, speculates that Wolesley may not have wanted another general to beat him to Khartoum.

Wolesley, in Moretz's view, also erred in not forming his naval brigade until almost the latest possible time, in November. The men and officers chosen for it were, while competent for the duties expected of them, scattered around the command, making it needlessly difficult to assemble them into a single unit and further wasting precious time. Poor planning also meant that the expedition got underway without sufficient coal. And perhaps as a consequence of the limited amount of troops he had available, Wolesley underestimated Ahmad's fighting spirit, resulting in greater losses and delays by the Desert Column, setbacks so severe that Wilson decided against the original objective of taking Metemmeh out of concern that he would not be able to hold it due to the casualties likely to be suffered. "Few generals are given the opportunity to redeem an earlier failure", Moretz writes. "Wolesley was one. Conceiving, organizing and commanding the operation launched in autumn of 1884, only a greater failure ensued."

== In popular culture ==
Lance Corporal Jones in the television sitcom Dad's Army claimed to have been involved in the Anglo-Egyptian invasion of Sudan in 1896–1899 and the Nile Expedition.

== See also ==
- Khartoum, 1966 film
- The Four Feathers, 1939 film
- The Four Feathers, 2002 film
- Pith helmet
