= Sidamara Sarcophagus =

3th-century AD Anatolian coffin

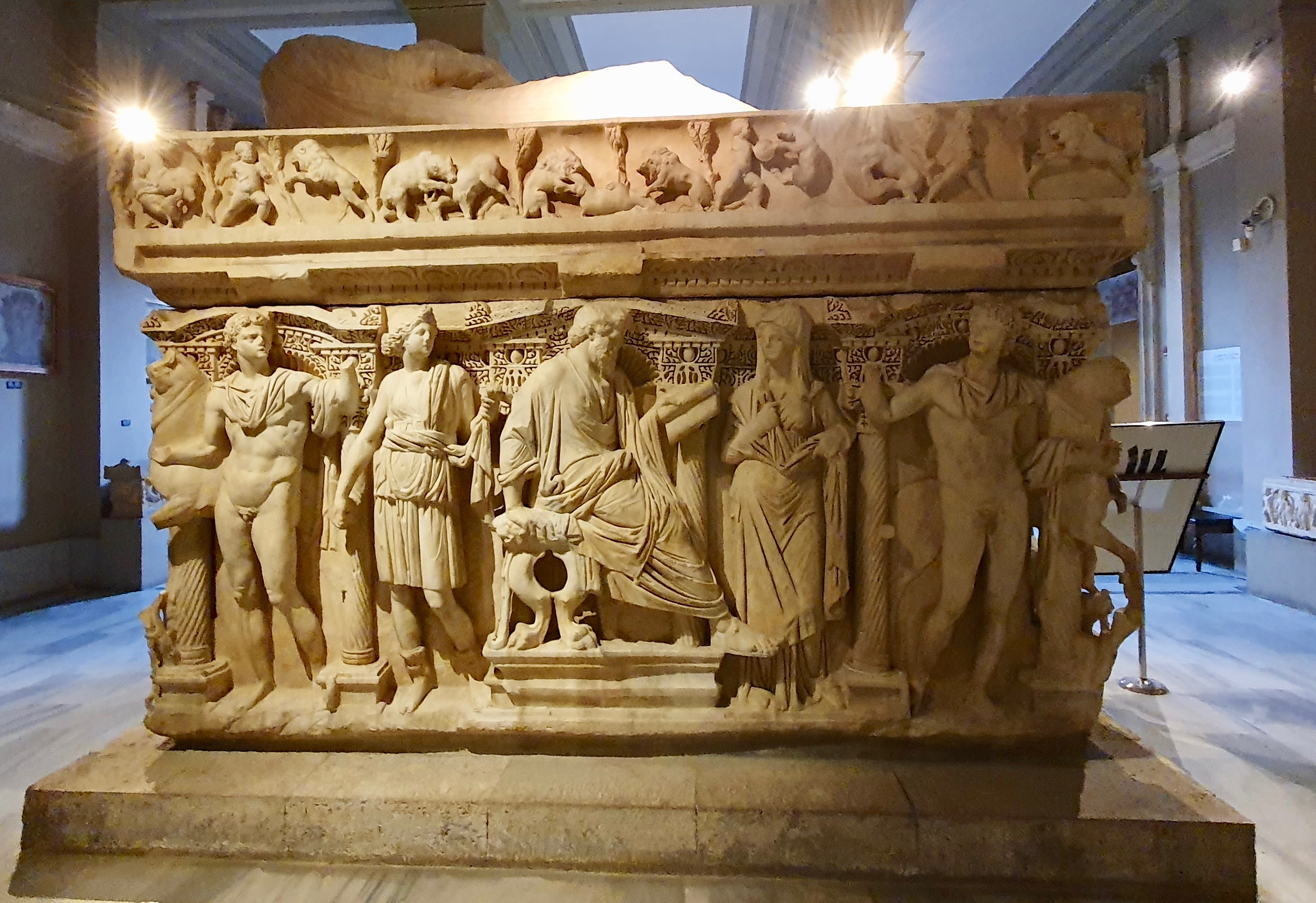
Sidamara Sarcophagus

The Sidamara Sarcophagus is a colossal Roman-era columnar sarcophagus known for its monumental size and decoration found in what is now Turkey. Dating from the 3rd century AD, it is considered one of the largest sarcophagi of the ancient world, and is known as the heaviest in the world, weighting 32 tons. It is today on display at the Istanbul Archaeology Museum.

== Discovery ==
The sarcophagus gets its name from its location in the village of Sidamara, in the Karaman Province of central Turkey. The artifact was first discovered by the British Military Consul General Charles William Wilson in 1882, but due to its immense weight, it could not be moved and was then buried again. It was re-discovered in 1898 by a villager in Sidamara.

Following investigations by Osman Hamdi Bey, the giant sarcophagus was moved to what is now the Istanbul Archaeology Museum. Its transportation in 1901 involved the use buffaloes and other special arrangements for train wagons.

== Dimensions and Architecture ==
The Sidamara Sarcophagus is characterized by its scale and architectural detail. Its length (3.81 m) and width (1.93 m) are approximately twice as long as wide. It also measures 200 cm in width. This proportion attests to the persistence of Athenian tradition, linking it to the great Athenian-made sarcophagi, the Alexander Sarcophagus and the Sarcophagus of the mourning women. These Athenian prototypes copied the proportions of the Erechtheion temple (22.507 x 11.634 m).

The Sidamara sarcophagus shows a departure in architectural detail from earlier styles. The stage façade (scaenae frons) has replaced the original temple colonnade. This change introduced the use of the gable and the arch instead of continuous Ionic architrave, necessitating an odd number of intercolumniations, resulting in five bays instead of the six on the Sarcophagus of the mourning women. This substitution may have been influenced by the statues placed in the Theatre of Dionysus at Athens.

The sarcophagus of Sidamara, along with the related Sarcophagus of Selefkeh, is thought to be derived from a common Athenian original carved perhaps in the late 4th century BC. Their shared provenance in southern Lycaonia and Cilicia suggests they may have been carved in Cilicia, possibly at Tarsus, while still retaining the Athenian tradition.

== Iconography and Interpretation ==
=== Principal relief: The Spartan Triad and the Poet ===
The main group on the front (or principal relief) is interpreted as a "well conceived unity" centered on the cult of the Dioscuri (Castor and Pollux) and their sister Helen, who were considered the "patron saints of the dead". At the center, a seated poet/philosopher can be found. He is listening attentively as he concludes reading a manuscript roll. The seated poet may have ultimately inspired by the statue of Menander in Athens.

The veiled woman identified with Helen stands facing the seated man. Her presence with a poet is appropriate based on the tradition that Helen appeared before Homer to command him to write the story of Troy.

At the two hands of the front face stand the Dioscuri, Castor and Pollux. These heroes hold the bridles of horses. The Dioscuri were protectors of poets. Behind them the poet stands another female figure, dressed as Artemis, the goddess of hunt which was closely associated with the Spartan triad.

=== Hunting and offering scenes ===
The balance of subject in the principal frieze is divided: one long side and one short side show figures at rest (the poet group), while the other long side and short side are decorated with a scene of hunting. The hunting scene is linked to the Dioscuri, who were famous hunters and participated in the Calydonian boar hunt. The juxtaposition of the lion and the deer appears in this scene.

=== The tomb portal ===
Two figures flank a portal in which a table of offerings is set. The veiled woman identified with Helen holds a patera and offers sepulchral fruit, specifically grapes and pomegranates, which were significant in the cult of the dead at Sparta. The bearded man is again the poet with a rotulus, a long and narrow strip of writing material.

The portal symbolizes the entrance to a temple-tomb, and the scene presents the tradition that Helen raised her brothers from death to godhood, implying the same happy destiny for the deceased and his devotees.

== Friezes and cover ==
The cover of the couch-sarcophagus has reclining figures of the deceased (the owner and his wife). This fusion of the temple and couch types is considered a late-development. The reclining male figure holds a routulus, suggesting the deceased was a poet. The small friezes on the base and cover feature further chapters of the Dioscuri theme, including scenes of contest and hunting. These scenes involve putti and Erotes fighting predators. There are also scenes of boxing, alluding to Pollux's fame as a boxer. A chariot race also appears, alluding to Castor's excellence with horses.

== Eros head ==
When the sarcophagus was first discovered, it still carried the Eros head, which was removed and taken to London. Charles Wilson loaned it to the Victoria and Albert (V&A) Museum, and in 1933 it was donated by his daughter, Marion Olivia Wilson, in memory of her father. By 1934, the British government indicated that the Victoria and Albert Museum could return the original head to Turkey. The museum considered exchanging it for a Byzantine marble piece, though Director Eric Maclagan noted that the move might prompt wider debates, including those about the Elgin Marbles. He still felt the head was more valuable restored to its monument than shown alone. In the end, the museum sent only a plaster replica, which was installed on the sarcophagus in the Istanbul Archaeological Museum. Decades later, a collaboration between Turkey's Ministry of Culture and Tourism and the V&A led to the original head being returned to Turkey on loan, allowing it to be reunited with the sarcophagus in June 2020.

== See also ==
- Ancient Roman sarcophagi
- Sarcophagi of Helena and Constantina

== Bibliography ==
=== Sources ===
- Bailey, Martin (2022-07-01). "Victoria and Albert Museum returns—and reattaches—a third-century marble head of Greek god taken from Turkey". The Art Newspaper.
- Elderkin, G. W. (1939). "The Sarcophagus of Sidamara". Hesperia: The Journal of the American School of Classical Studies at Athens. 8 (2): 101. doi:10.2307/146587.
