= Istanbul Archaeology Museums =

- İstanbul Arkeoloji Müzeleri
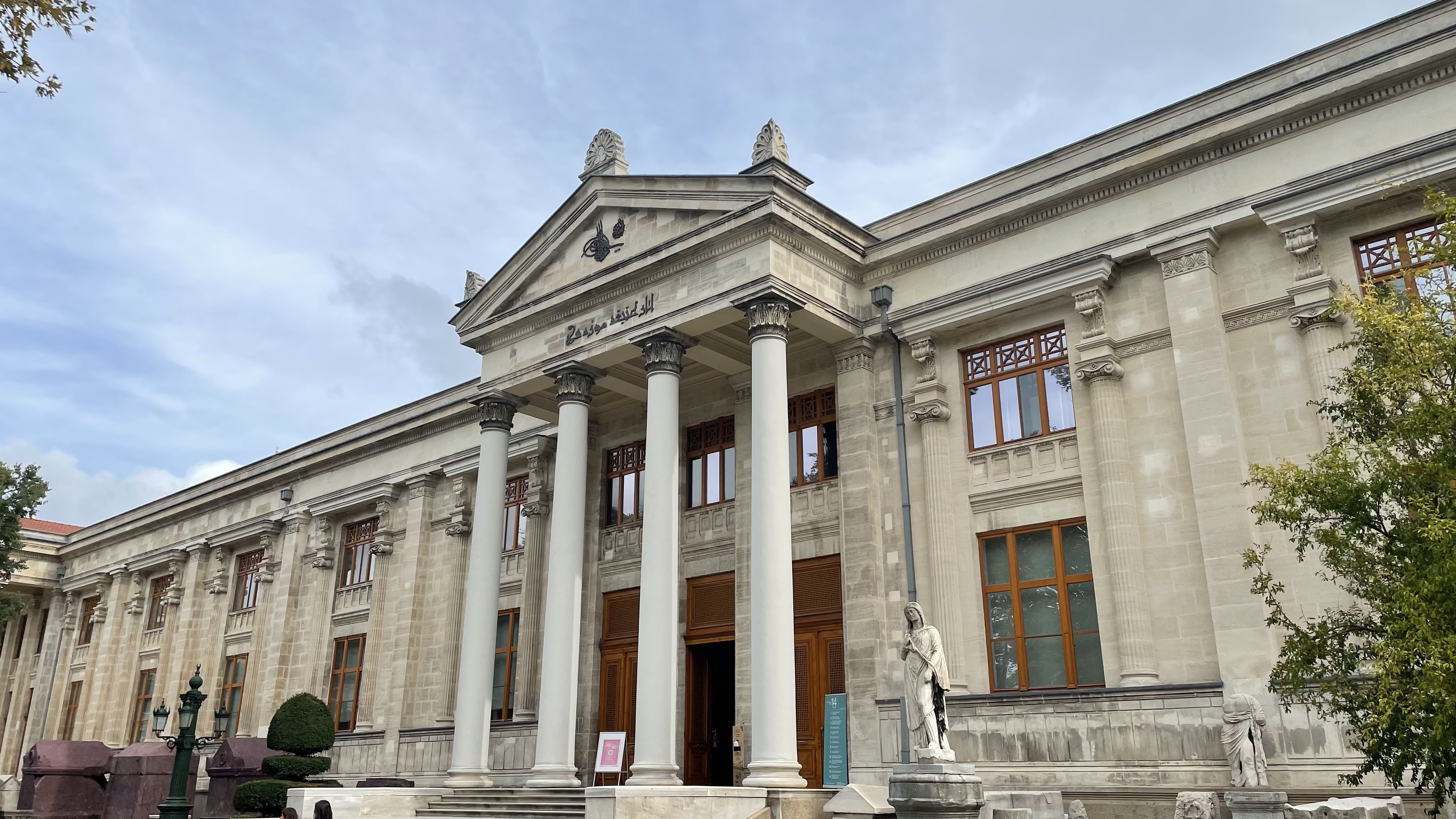
- Entrance gate of the Archaeological Museum
- Established: 13 July 1891; 135 years ago
- Location: Osman Hamdi Bey Yokuşu; Sokak, Gülhane, Istanbul, Turkey
- Coordinates: 41.010872°N 28.981659°E
- Type: Archaeology museum
- Collection size: Approx. 1 million objects
- Visitors: 530.065 (2022)
- Founder: Osman Hamdi Bey
- Director: Rahmi Asal
- Website: Official website

The Istanbul Archaeology Museums (Turkish: İstanbul Arkeoloji Müzeleri) are a group of three archaeological museums located in the Eminönü quarter of Istanbul, Turkey, near Gülhane Park and Topkapı Palace. These museums house over one million objects from nearly all periods and civilizations in world history.

The Istanbul Archaeology Museums consists of three museums:

1. Archaeological Museum, located in the main building
2. Museum of the Ancient Orient
3. Museum of Islamic Art, housed in the Tiled Kiosk

== Background ==
The origins of the museum can be traced back to the nearby Hagia Irene Church. After the conquest of Istanbul, the church's location close to the barracks of the Janissaries saw it transformed into a de facto 'inner arsenal' for storing their weapons (Turkish: İç Cebehane). By 1726, during the reign of Sultan Ahmed III, it functioned as a full-fledged armory known as Dar-ül Esliha (Turkish: House of Weapons). By the 19th century, the church was also being used to store the varied artifacts amassed by the Ottoman Empire.

The Ottoman Sultan Abdülaziz (r. 1861–1876) was impressed by the archaeological museums in Paris (30 June – 10 July 1867), London (12–23 July 1867) and Vienna (28–30 July 1867) which he visited in the summer of 1867, and ordered a similar archaeological museum to be established in Istanbul. It was then, in 1869, that the church and the works in it were inaugurated by decree under the name of Imperial Museum (Ottoman Turkish: Müze-i Hümayun or Turkish: İmparatorluk Müzesi). As such, the Istanbul Archaeological Museum is often considered the "first museum of Turkey".

== History ==
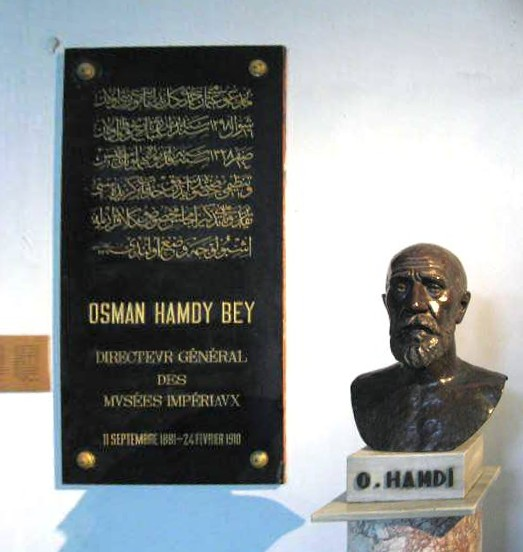
Bust and memorial plaque to Osman Hamdi Bey in the foyer of the main building.

Due to space constraints, the museum and its collection was transferred to the Tiled Kiosk (Turkish: Çinili Köşk) between 1875 and 1891. Commissioned by Sultan Mehmed II in 1472 as a pleasure palace, it is the oldest non-religious Ottoman structure in Istanbul and retains a visible Persian influence in its style and architecture It was first opened to the public in 1953 as the Fatih Museum, to showcase Turkish and Islamic art, and was later incorporated into the Istanbul Archaeological Museum.

Appointed to the role in 1881, the first curator and founder of the museum was Osman Hamdi Bey, Painter, Archeologist and son of İbrahim Edhem Pasha, an Ottoman Grand Vizier. An accomplished artist, in 2019 his painting Girl Reading the Quran sold for 6.3 million British pounds, making it the most expensive Turkish painting at that time.

Throughout the 19th century, the existing importance given by the European states to historical artifacts gradually began to be understood by the Ottoman Empire as well. Thereunto arose the issue of establishing a method of regulating these cultural assets. Up to that point in time, 'historical artifacts' in the Ottoman Empire were subject to the common principles of fiqh. The absence of specific regulations for preserving historical artifacts in effect created a legal void surrounding aspects such as the definition of historical artifacts, along with where and how they would be preserved.

This changed in 1869, when the first set of laws were enacted that outlined the regulation of antiquities. Modern conservation experts refer to this as the first 'protection law' issued by the Ottoman State, focusing on permissions to carry out excavations and related artifact management. According to this law, the owner of land on which an excavation was conducted could claim possession of the finds discovered. While it was illegal to take such relics abroad, they could be bought and sold within domestic borders and the state held the principal right to buy them. With this imperial decree for protecting cultural goods now being enforced, provincial governors throughout the Ottoman Empire would send in found artefacts to the capital city, thus further growing the collection.

With subsequent major finds being discovered shortly thereafter, e.g. excavation of the necropolis of King Sidon in modern-day Lebanon, it soon became clear that a purpose-built building large enough to house the growing museum collection was required.

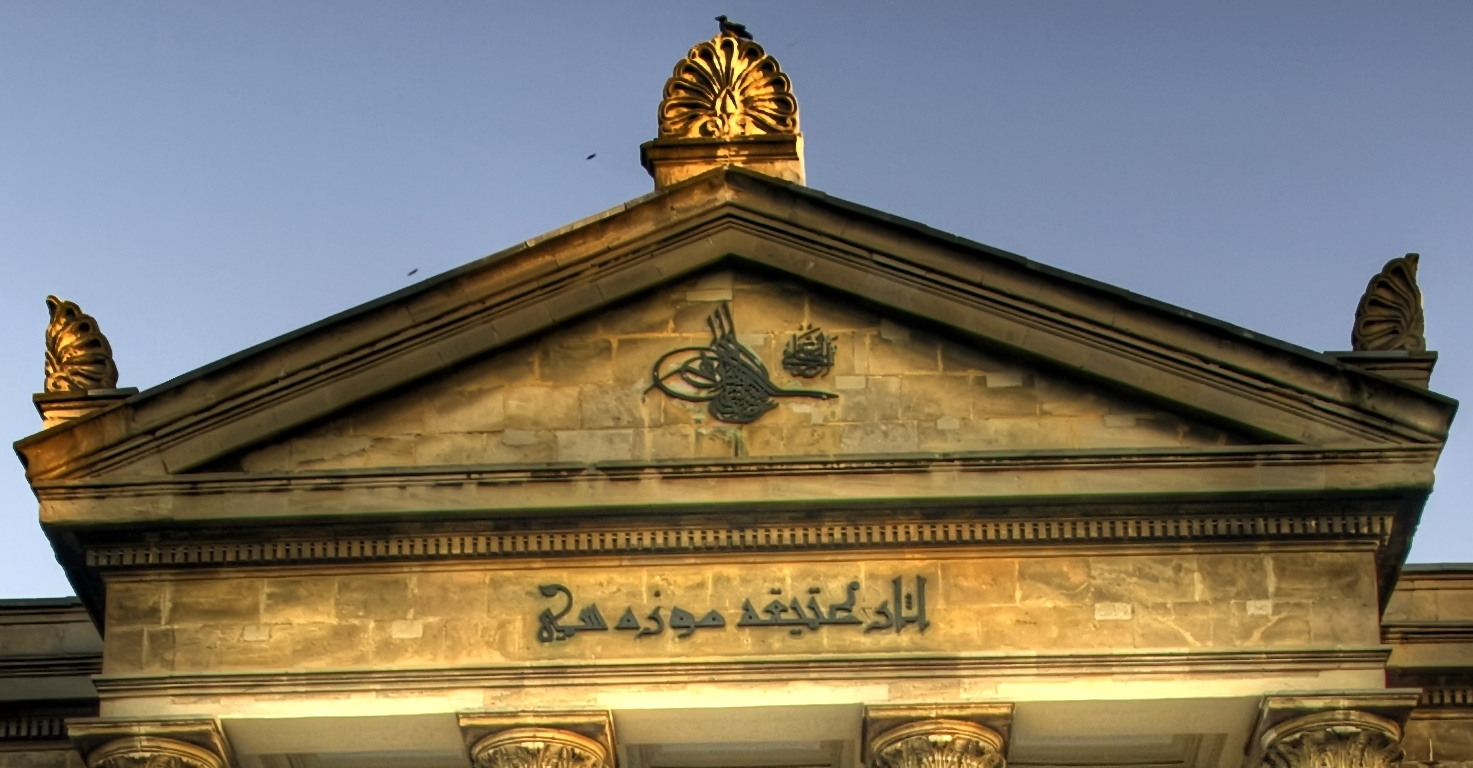
Pediment of Istanbul Archaeological Museum, with Ottoman Turkish اثار عتيقة موزسي "Asar-ı Atika Müzesi" (Museum of Antiquities), and the tughra of Abdulhamid II.

The construction of the main building was started by Hamdi Bey in 1881, with its official opening held on June 13, 1891. The architect was Alexander Vallaury who also designed the Pera Palace Hotel in Istanbul. The facade of the building was inspired by the Alexander Sarcophagus and Sarcophagus of the Mourning Women, both housed inside the museum. The inscription in Ottoman Turkish on the pediments of the gates at the entrance of the museum says Asar-ı Atika Müzesi" (English: Museum of Antiquities). The tughra on the inscription belongs to Sultan Abdulhamid II. The building is considered by many as the preeminent example of neoclassical style architecture in Istanbul. Upon its 100th anniversary in 1991, the museum received the European Council Museum Award, particularly for the renovations made to the lower floor halls in the main building and the new displays in the other buildings.

The Museum of the Ancient Orient was commissioned by Osman Hamdi Bey in 1883 as a fine arts school. Then it was reorganised as a museum, which opened in 1935. Collections are relating to Anatolian history, including the Early Bronze Age, Assyrian Colony Period, Hittite, Neo-Hittite, Urartian, Aramean, as well as Mesopotamian, Egyptian, Syrian, Iran, Palestinian and Ancient Arabian cultures. The Egyptian collection comprises approximately 1,200 items, featuring artifacts representing various forms of Egyptian art. Most of them had come from Dra Abu al Nagar excavations near Karnak excavated by Gautier in 1891. Other items were gifts from the Khedives of Egypt and Ottoman officers. Mesopotamian artifacts are 10,000 pieces that came from Assur, Nippur, Lagash, Girsu, Uruk, Shurupak, Sippar, Nineveh excavations. Palestinian objects are from Tell Gezer, Tell Zakarijah, Tell el-Hesi, Tell Taannek, Tell Sandahanna, Megiddo and Jericho excavations in Ottoman times. Several Susa vases were purchased from French excavators.

== Gallery ==
=== Museum buildings and the courtyard ===
Archaeological museum building and the courtyard

Tiled Kiosk housing the Museum of Islamic Art

Museum of the Ancient Orient

Draped female statue at the main entrance of the archaeological museum

Outdoor display artifacts in the courtyard

=== Collection highlights ===
Osman Hamdi Bey sitting alongside museum officials in the archaeological museum

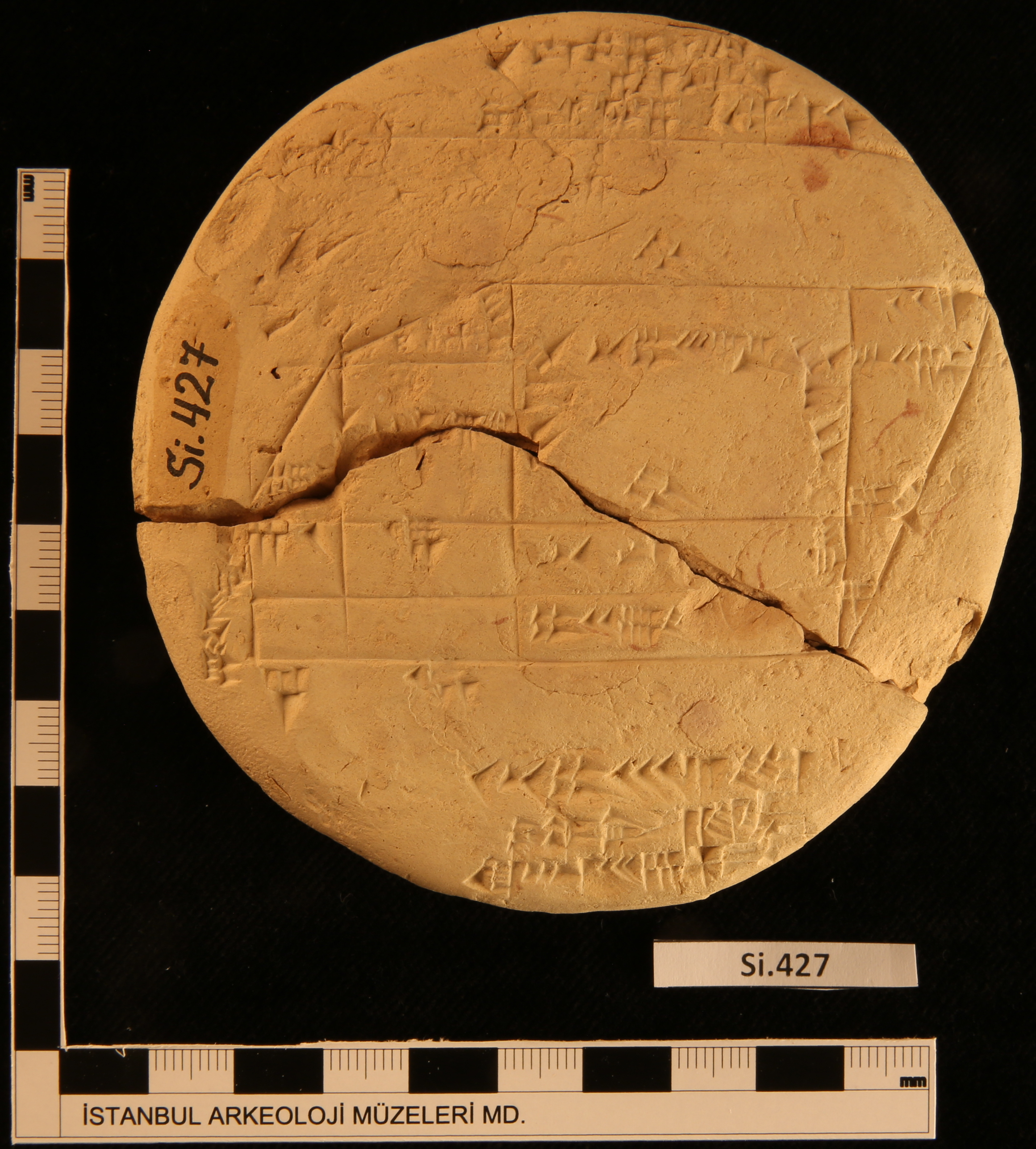
Si.427 obverse, dates from the Old Babylonian period between 1900 and 1600 BCE. Discovered in the late 19th century in what is now Iraq.

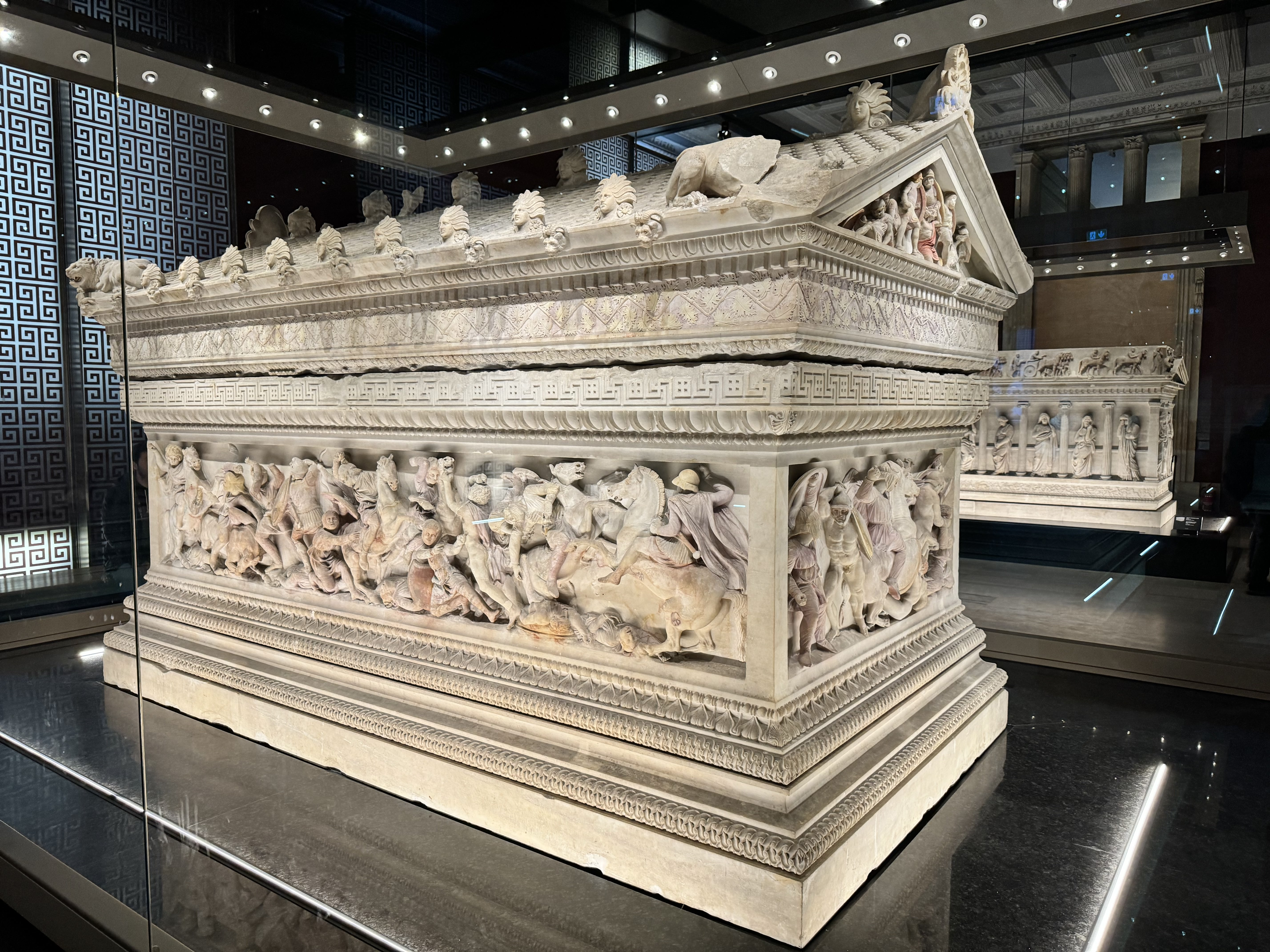
The Alexander Sarcophagus, found at the Royal necropolis of Ayaa in Sidon

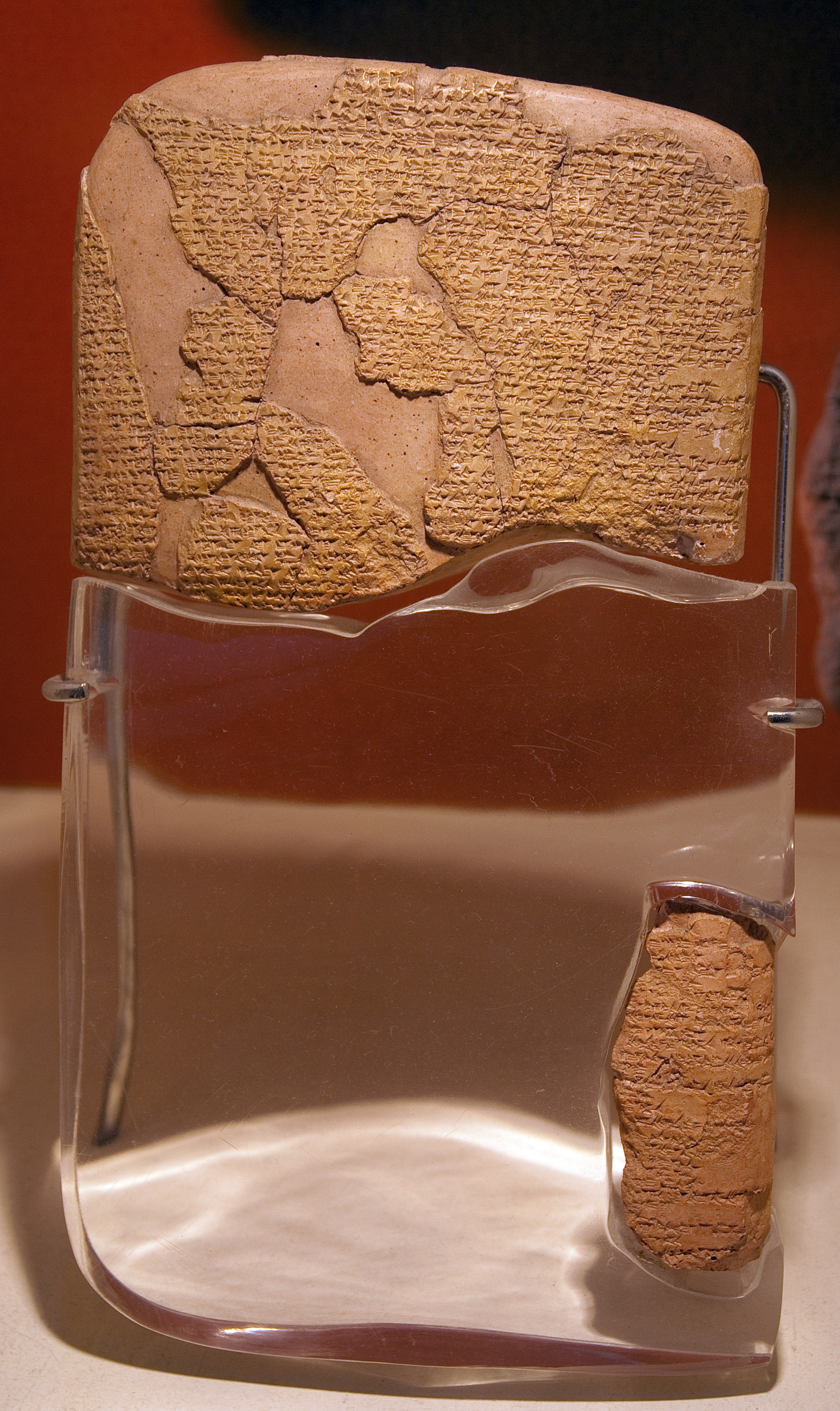
The Egyptian–Hittite peace treaty

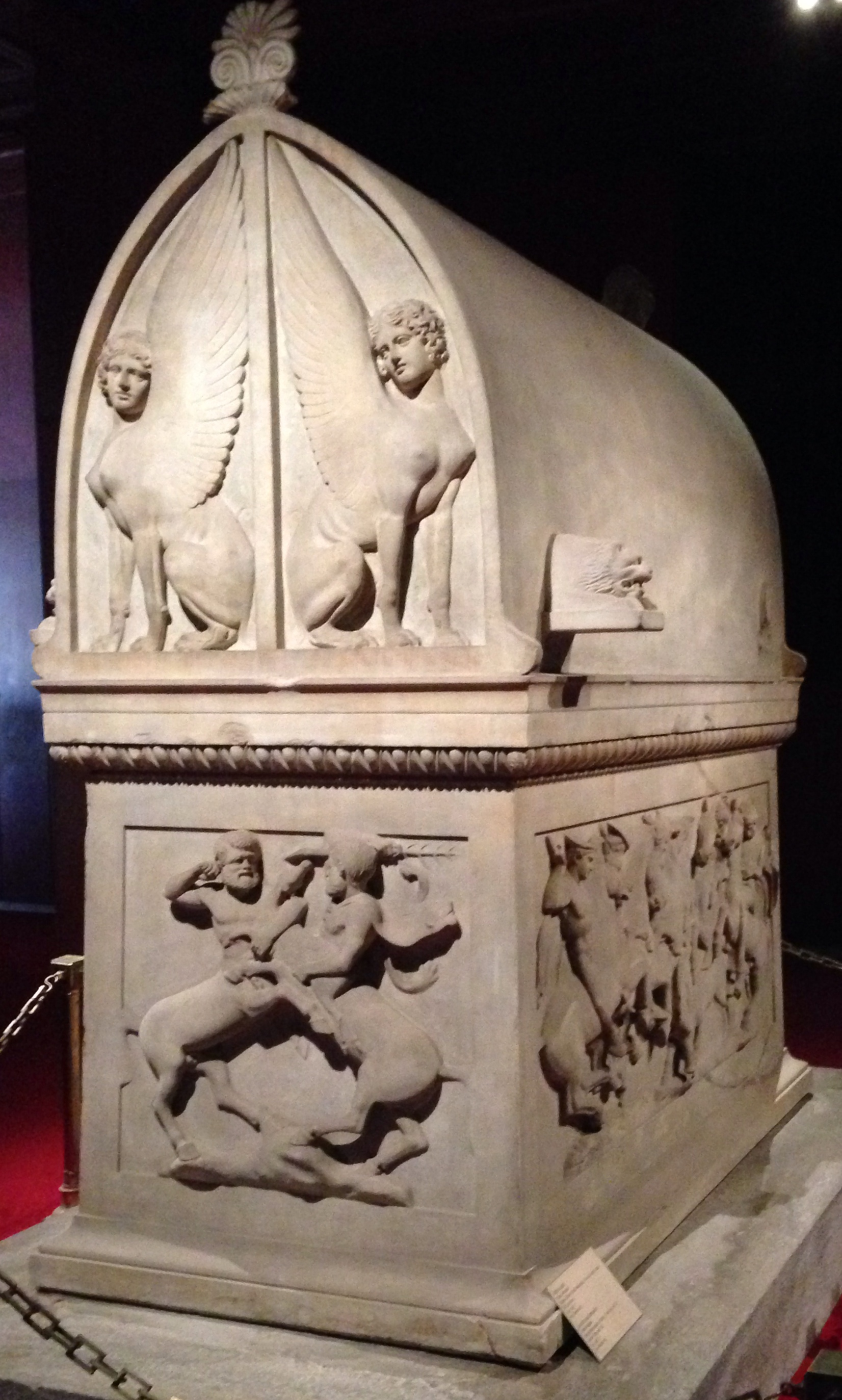
Lycian sarcophagus of Sidon in Parian marble from the Royal necropolis of Ayaa in Sidon

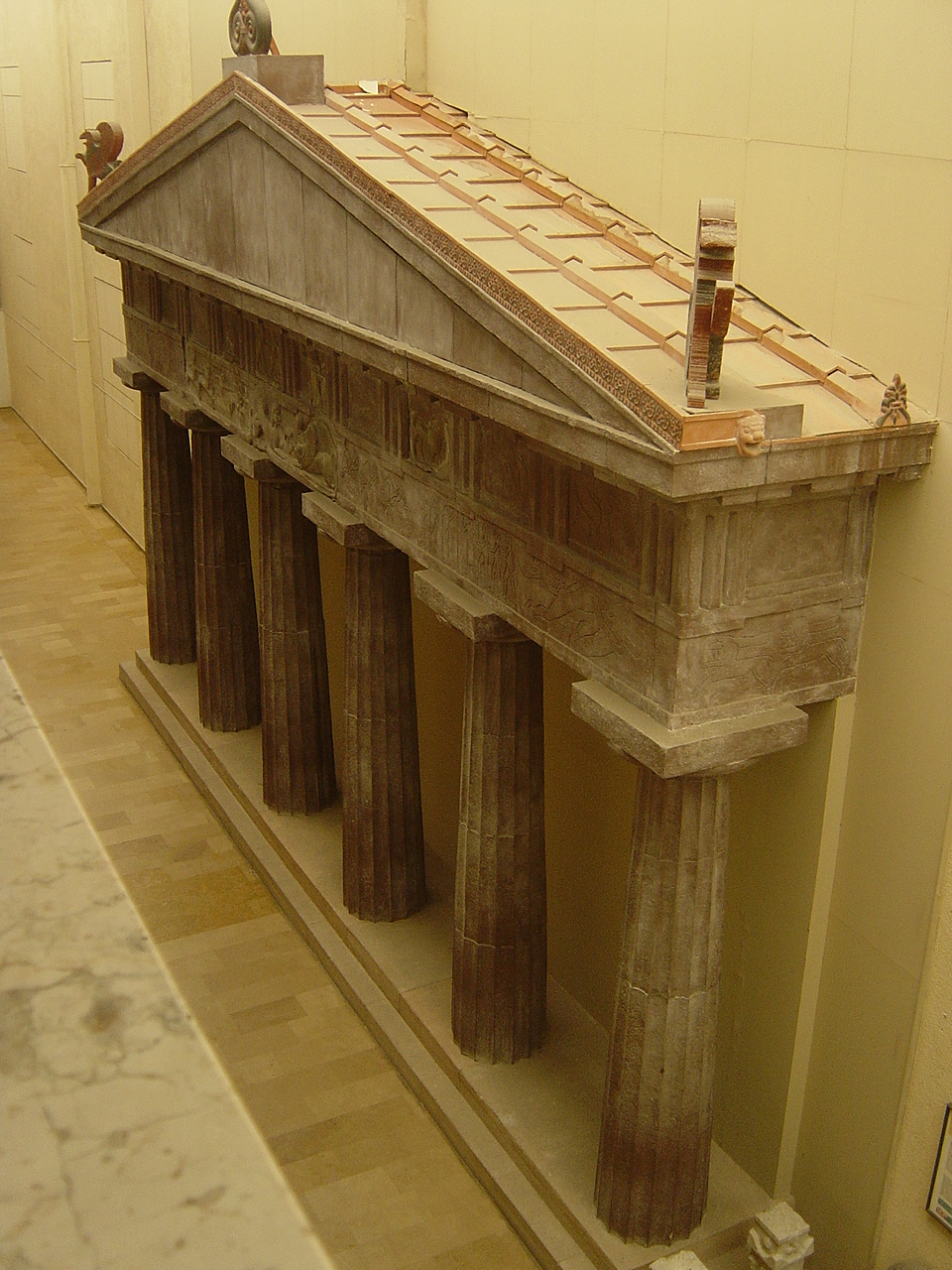
Pediment and shafts of a temple

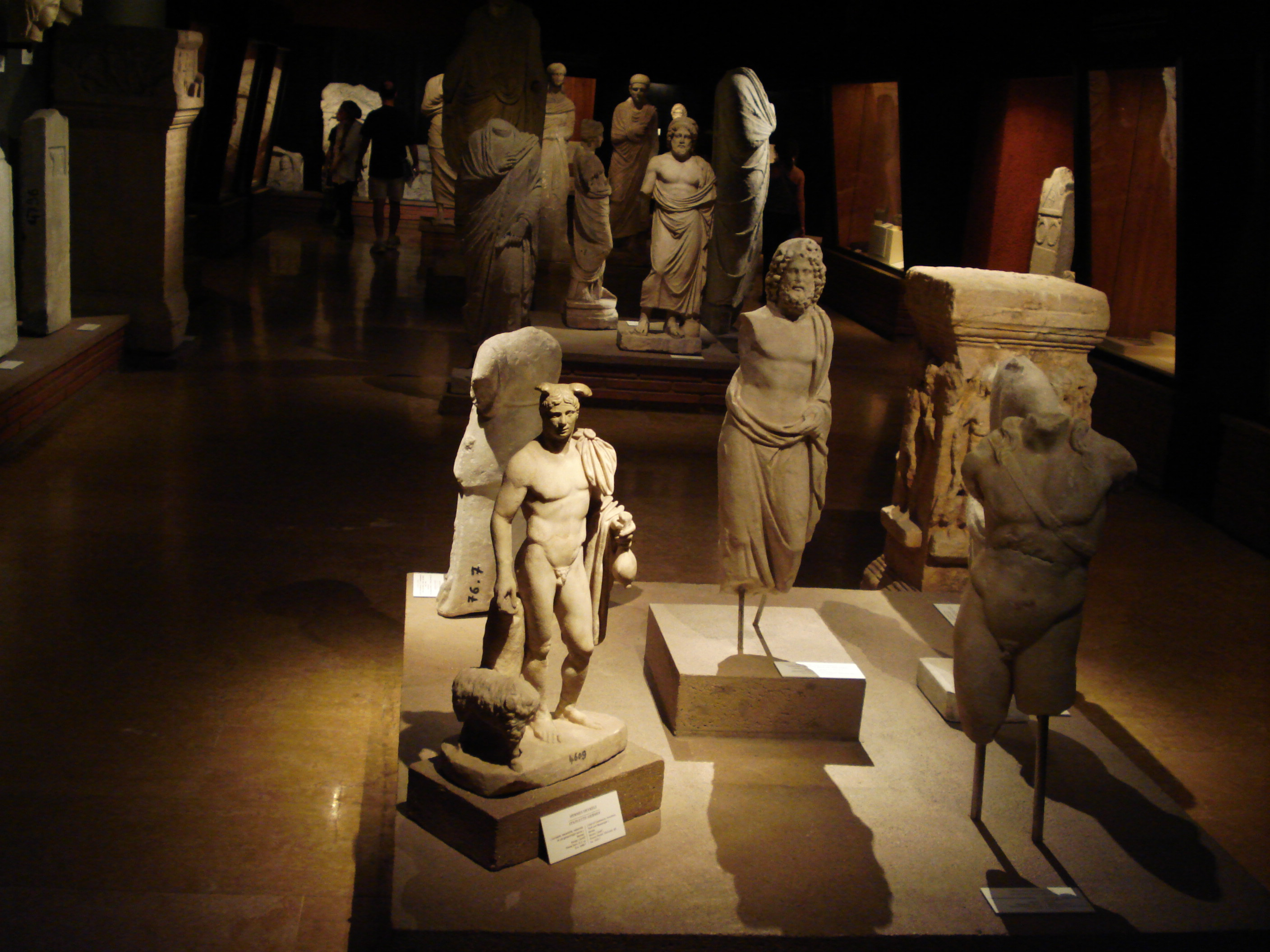
Ancient Greek exhibition of the museum

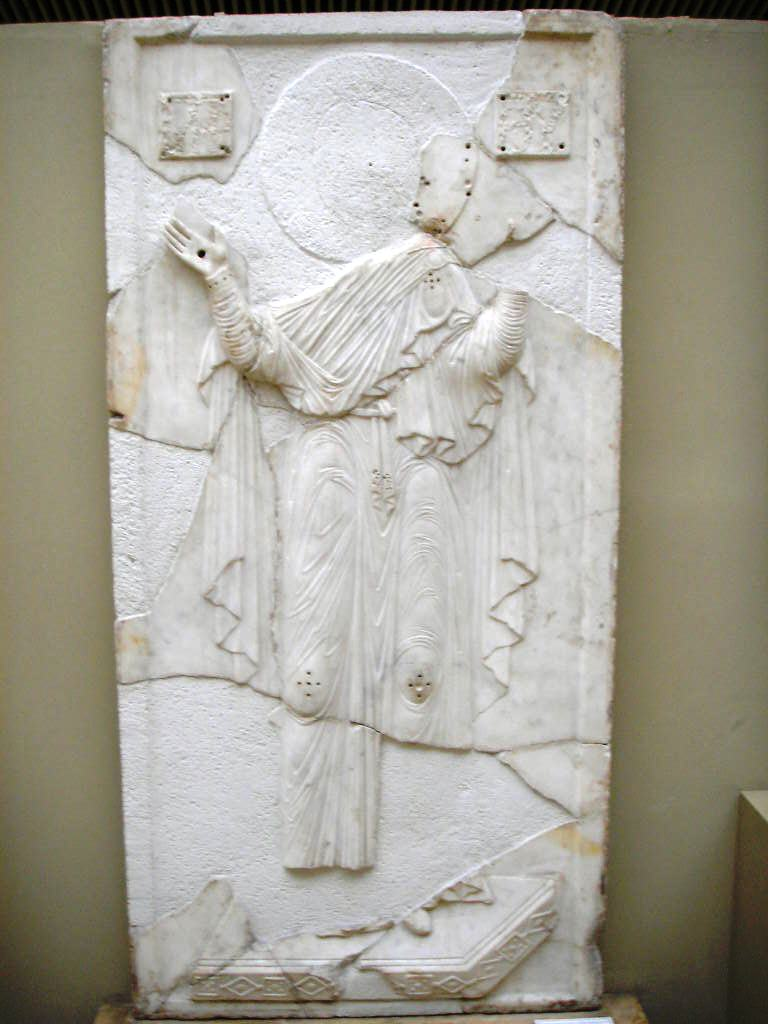
Icon with relief Virgin Mary at prayer

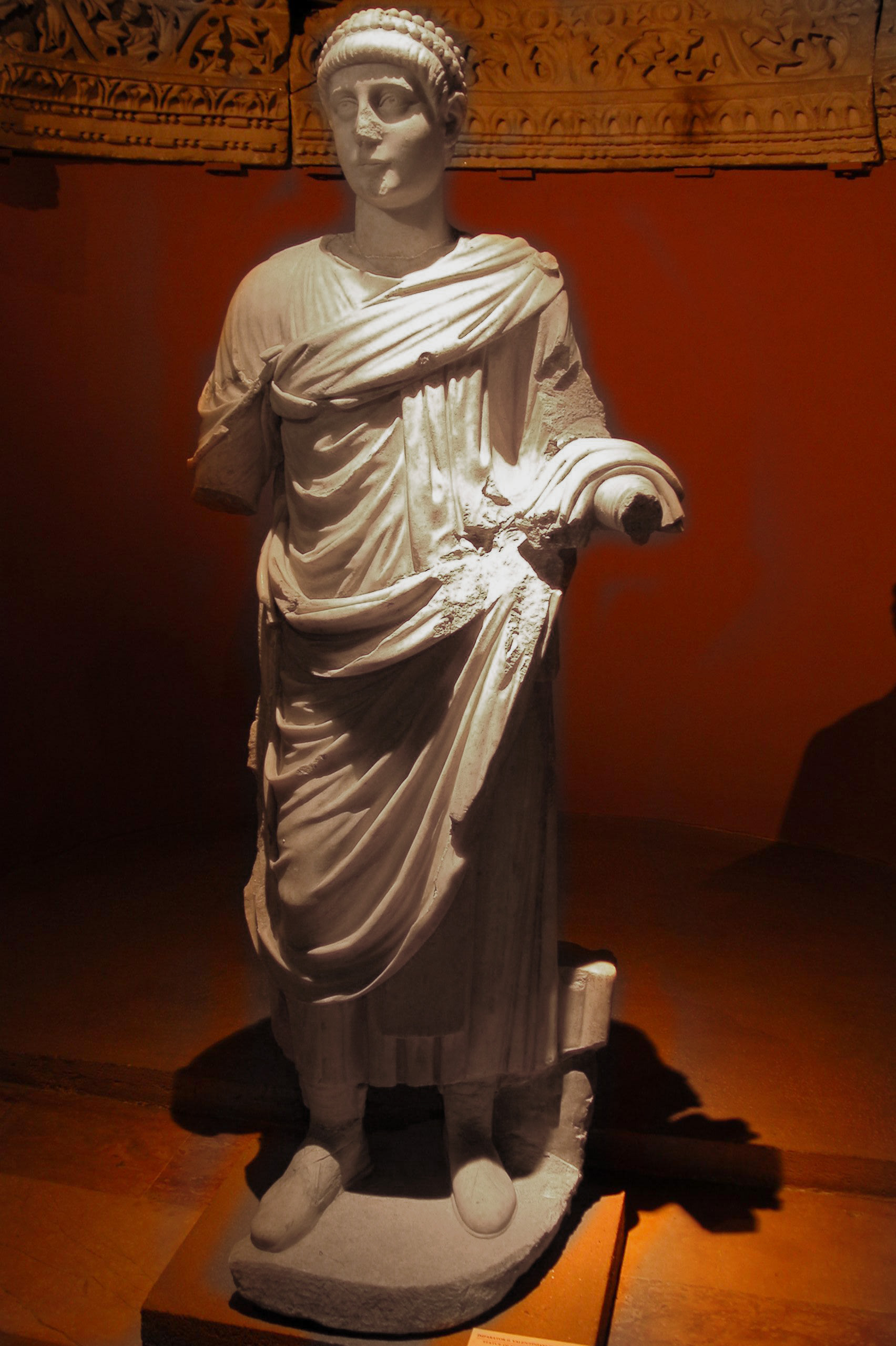
Statue of Emperor Valentinian II

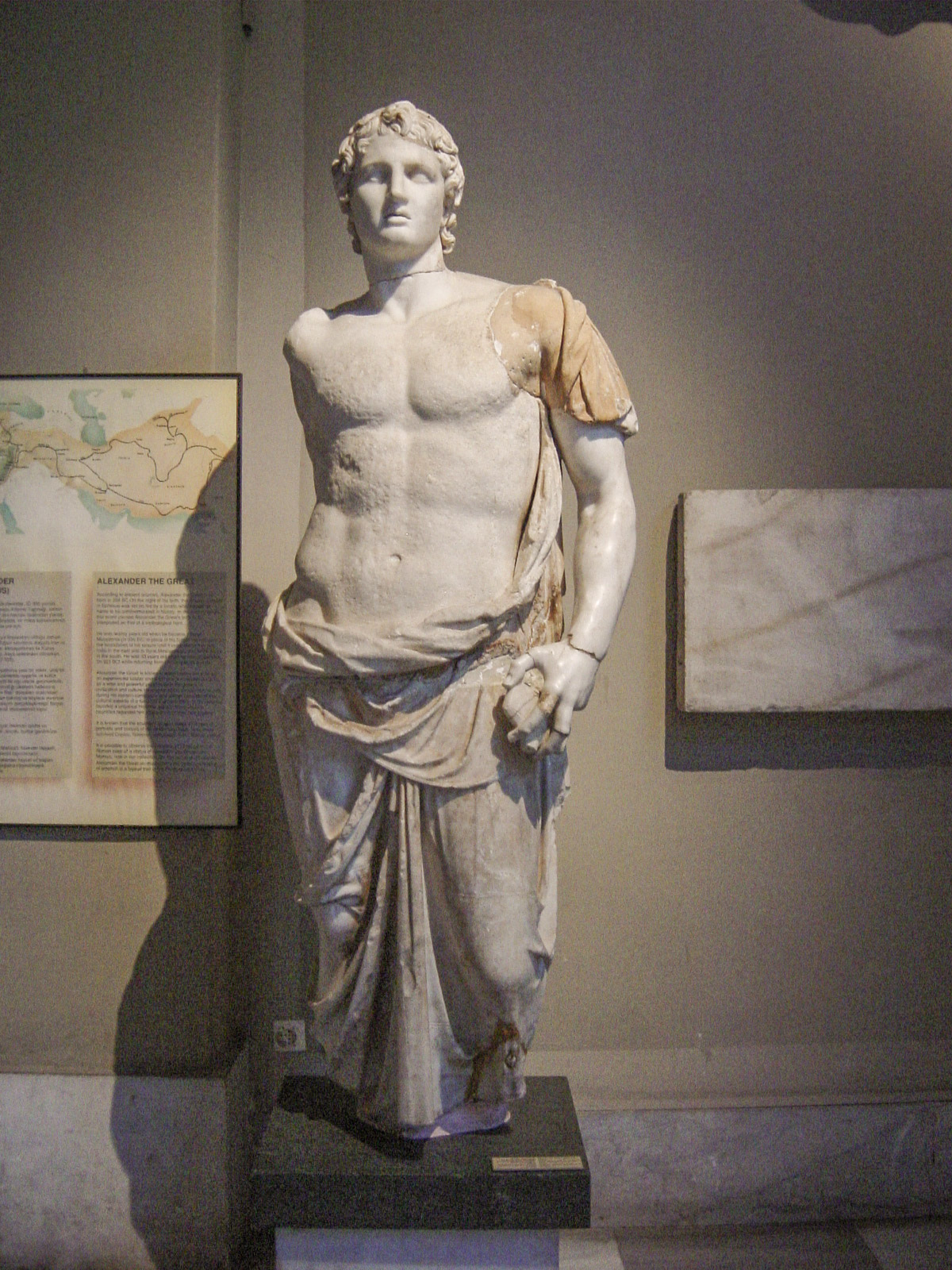
Statue of Alexander the Great

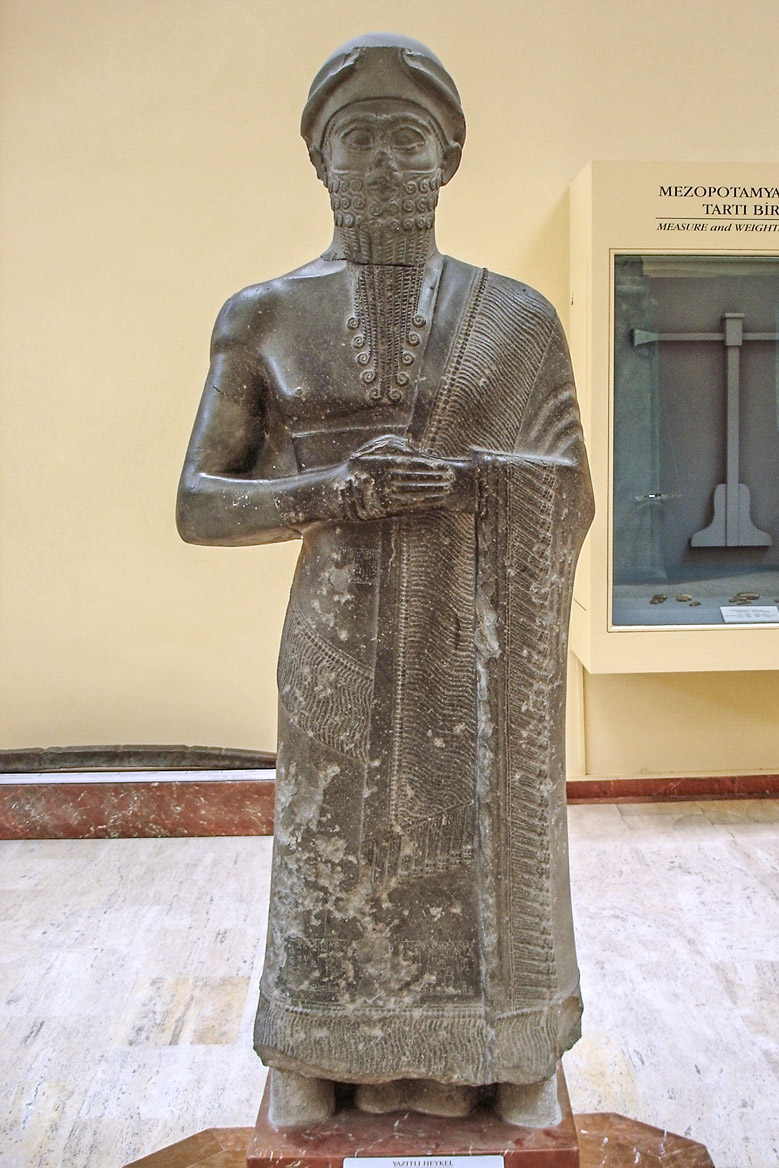
Puzur Ishtar, governor of Mari

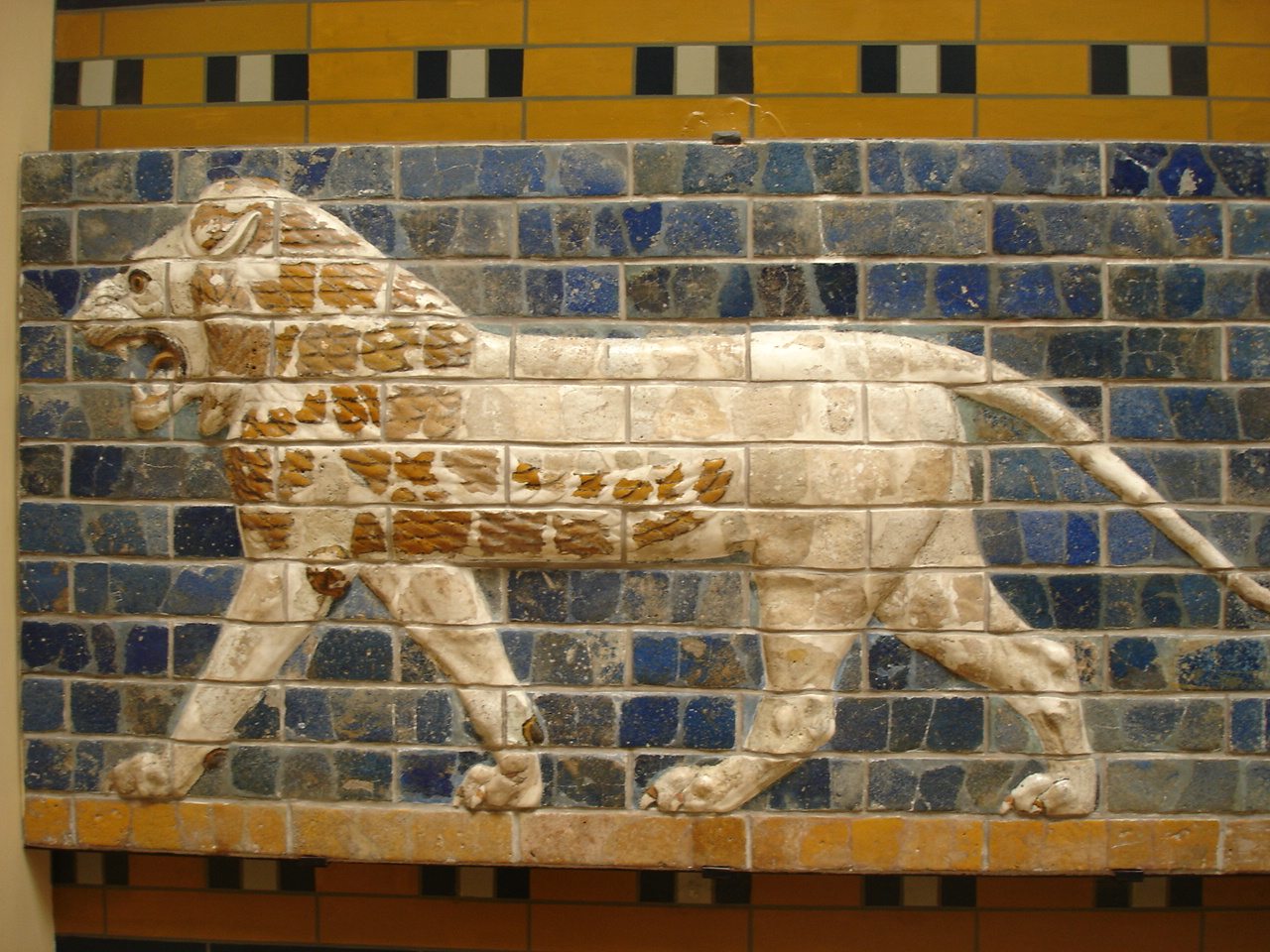
Glazed brick panel from way to Ishtar Gate

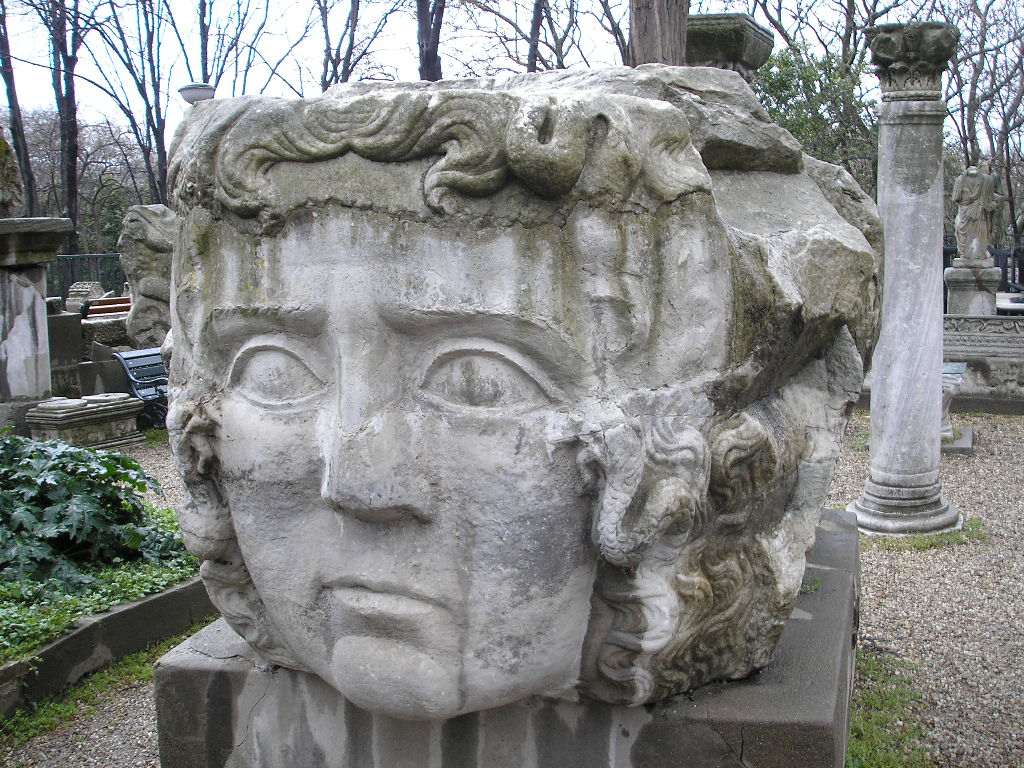
Keystone that was probably a part of the Forum of Constantine

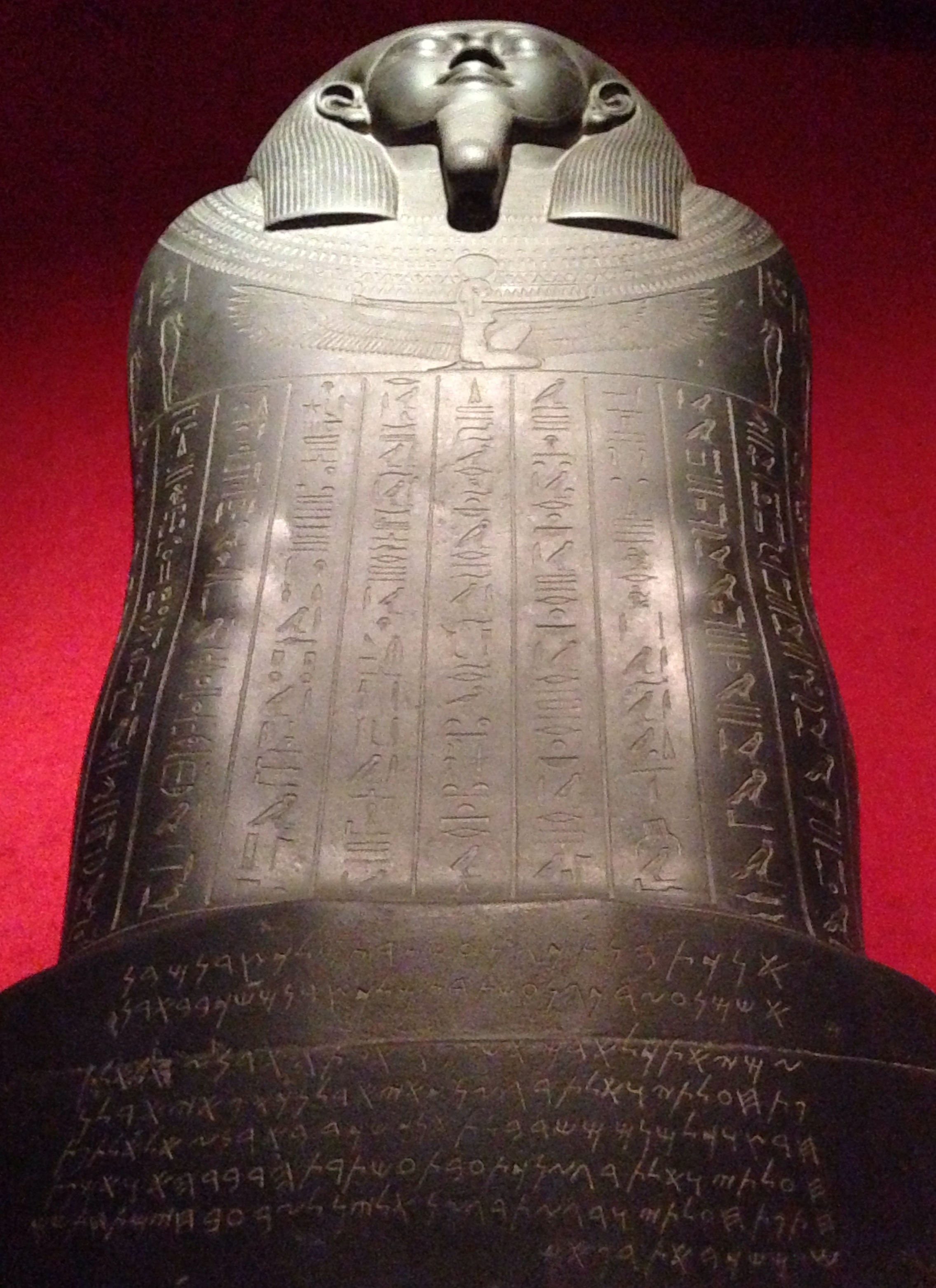
Tabnit sarcophagus in Diorite from the Royal necropolis of Ayaa in Sidon

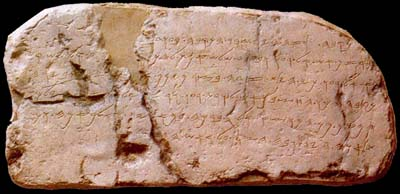
Siloam Inscription

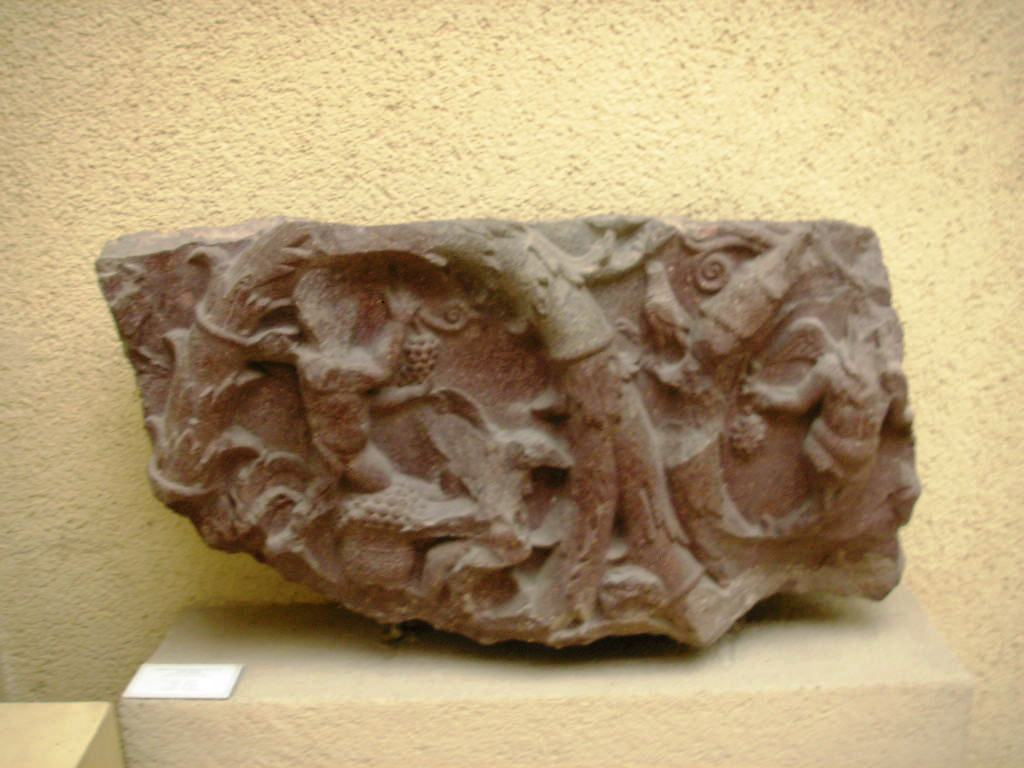
A fragment of a Byzantine sarcophagus that is believed to belong to Constantine the Great.

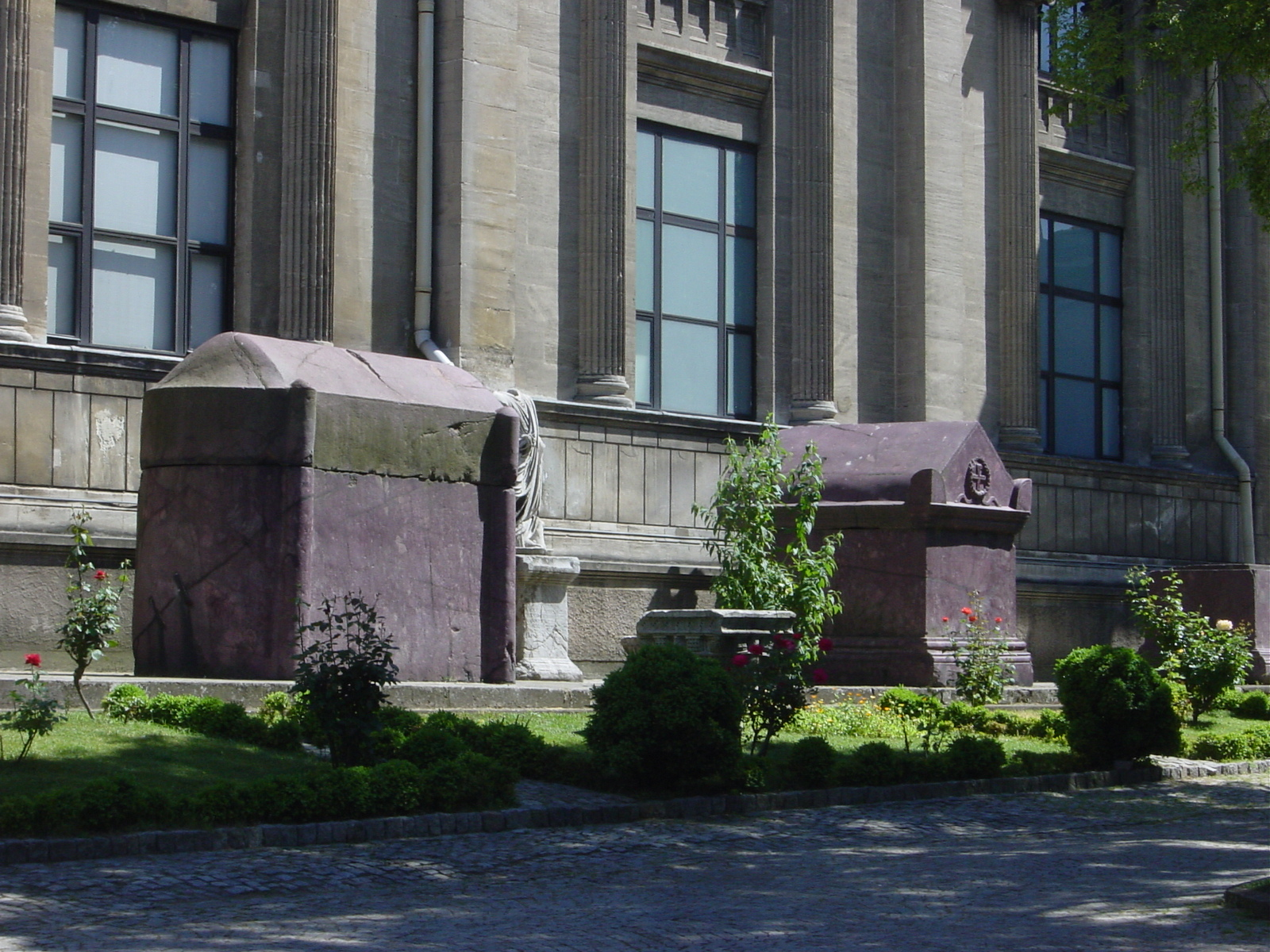
Porphyry sarcophagi of Byzantine emperors

Roman-era garland sarcophagus, marble, from Iasos, 2nd century CE.

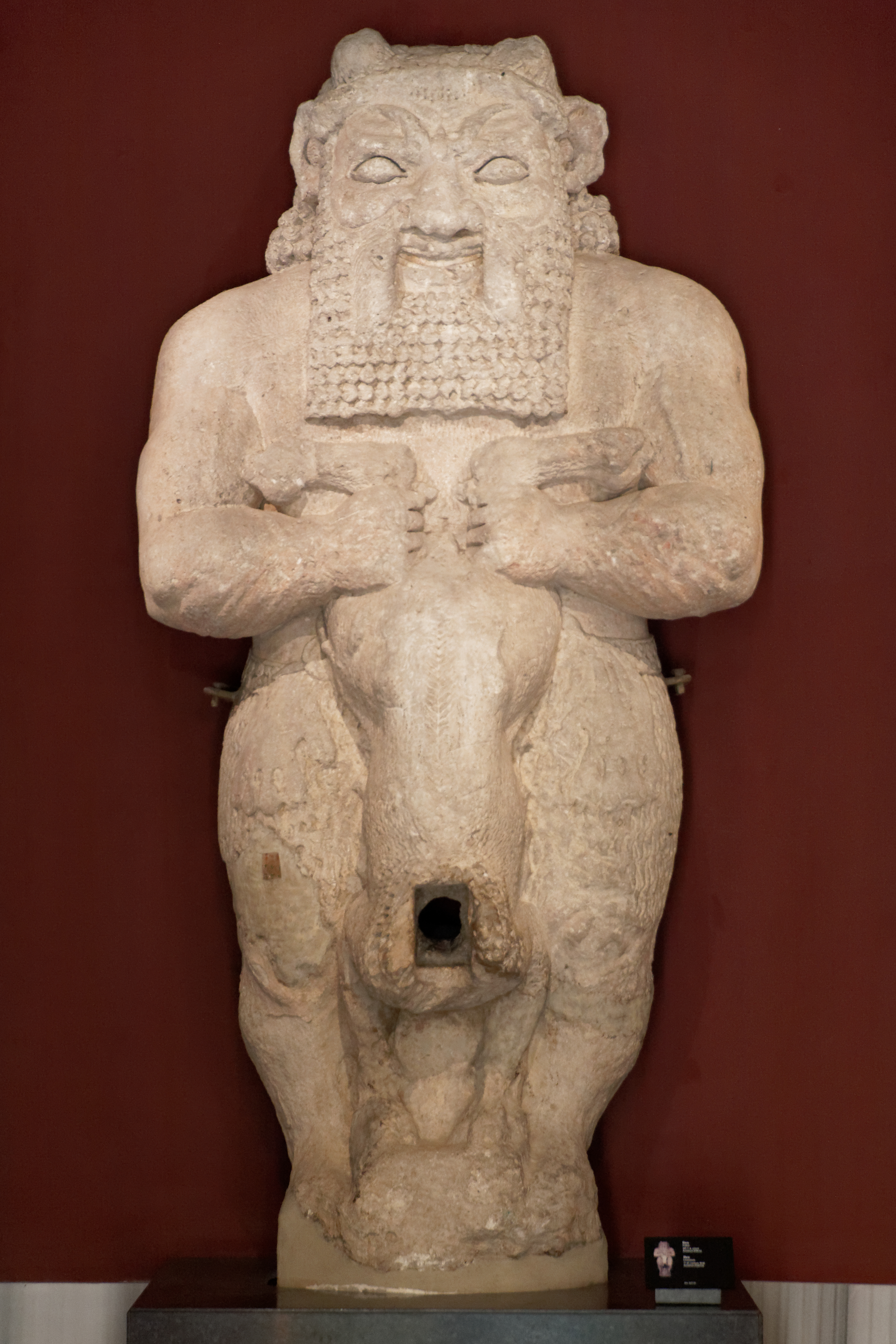
God Bes, limestone, from Amathus, 7th-6th century BC

Marble anthropoid sarcophagi from Sidon, dated to the 5th century BC

Polychrome marble statue of goddess Tyche and the infant Plutus.

Marble statue of Oceanus, the River-God, from Ephesus, early 2nd century CE

Marble statue of Emperor Hadrian, from Hierapytna, Crete, c. 117-138 CE

Troy VI exhibit, one of the showcases

Sitting Cybele statuette, terracotta, from Troy IX, 3rd century BC

== Collection ==
The museums have a large collection of Turkish, Hellenistic and Roman artifacts, many gathered from the vast former territories of the Ottoman Empire. The five most prominent artifacts exhibited in the museum include:

- The ornate sarcophagi from the Royal necropolis of Ayaa in Sidon:
  - The Alexander Sarcophagus, found in the Ayaa necropolis of Sidon. Once believed to be prepared for Alexander the Great, is among the most famous pieces of ancient art in the museum.
  - Sarcophagus of the mourning women, also found in the Ayaa necropolis of Sidon (in fact, the sarcophagus of Strato I, king of Sidon)
  - The Tabnit sarcophagus
  - The Sarcophagus of the Satrap
  - The Lycian sarcophagus of Sidon
- Glazed tile images from the Ishtar Gate of Babylon
- Statues from ancient antiquity until the end of the Roman Era, from Aphrodisias, Ephesus and Miletus
- Statue of an Ephebos
- Statue of Apollo Citharoedus from Miletus
- Parts of statues from the Temple of Zeus found at Bergama
- A marble lion from the Mausoleum of Mausolus, one of the few pieces remaining in Turkey
- Snake's head from the Serpentine Column erected in the Hippodrome of Constantinople
- Mother-Goddess Cybele and votive stelai
- Busts of Alexander the Great and Zeus
- Fragments from the temple of Athena at Assos
- The Troy exhibit
- 800,000 Ottoman coins, seals, decorations and medals
- One tablet with the oldest known law-collection, the laws of king Ur-Nammu
- Two of the three tablets of the Egyptian–Hittite peace treaty (1258 BCE), signed between Ramesses II of Egypt and Hattusili III of the Hittite Empire. It is the oldest known peace treaty in the world, and a giant poster of these tablets containing the treaty is on the wall of the United Nations Headquarters in New York City.
- The Saba'a Stele of the Assyrian king Adad-nirari III
- The Sidamara Sarcophagus
- Tablet archive containing some 75,000 documents with cuneiform inscriptions, including one containing the oldest known love poem, the Istanbul #2461 tablet
- Artifacts from the early civilizations of Anatolia, Mesopotamia, Arabia and Egypt
- Siloam inscription, which made headlines in July 2007 when Israel asked for its return.
- Gezer calendar
- Balawat Gates, a single gate
- Samaria ostraca
- Warning inscription from the Second Temple in Jerusalem

== See also ==
- Great Palace Mosaic Museum
- Museum of Anatolian Civilizations
- Turkish and Islamic Arts Museum
- List of museums and monuments in Istanbul
- List of Intangible Cultural Heritage elements in Turkey
