= Herbert Stewart =

British general (1843–1885)

Major-General Sir Herbert Stewart KCB
- Engraving in The Illustrated London News, February 1885
- Born: 30 June 1843; Sparsholt, Hampshire, England
- Died: 16 February 1885 (aged 41) near Jakdul, Sudan
- Military career
- Allegiance: United Kingdom
- Branch: British Army
- Service years: 1863–1885
- Rank: Major-General
- Conflicts: Anglo-Zulu War; First Boer War; Anglo-Egyptian War; Mahdist War
- Awards: Knight Commander of the Order of the Bath; Mentioned in Despatches (5); Order of Saint Sava (Serbia); Order of Osmanieh, 3rd Class (Ottoman Empire)
- Cricket career

Personal information
- Height: 5 ft 11 in (1.80 m)
- Batting: Right-handed
- Role: Wicket-keeper

Domestic team information
- Years: Team
- 1869: Marylebone Cricket Club
- 1869: Hampshire

Career statistics
Competition	First-class
Matches	4
Runs scored	19
Batting average	2.71
100s/50s	–/–
Top score	8
Catches/stumpings	2/1
- Source: Herbert Stewart at Cricinfo

Major-General Sir Herbert Stewart KCB (30 June 1843 – 16 February 1885) was an English first-class cricketer and British Army officer. A career soldier, he joined the 37th Foot in November 1863 and would later transfer to the 3rd Dragoon Guards. Six years into his military career, he played cricket at first-class level for Hampshire and the Marylebone Cricket Club. Ten years later, he saw action in South Africa in the Anglo-Zulu War under the command of Major-General Frederick Marshall, and served shortly after the conclusion of that conflict in the actions against Sekhukhune I of the Bapedi.

Stewart later saw action in the First Boer War that began in December 1880, and was captured following the Boer victory at Majuba Hill in February 1881. Released the following month, Stewart served in the Anglo-Egyptian War of 1882, where he was instrumental in the capture of both Cairo and the rebel leader Ahmed Urabi; he was highly decorated for his role in the war. After Major-General Charles Gordon became besieged at Khartoum by Sudanese Mahdist forces, Stewart led a column across the desert as part of the Gordon Relief Expedition. After several engagements, Stewart was wounded in action on 19 January 1885. He survived long enough to hear of his promotion to major-general, before succumbing to his wound on 16 February.

== Early life ==
Herbert Stewart was born in Sparsholt, Hampshire on 30 June 1843. He was the eldest son of the Scottish politician and clergyman Edward Stewart. His grandfather was Edward Richard Stewart and his great-grandfather was John Stewart, 7th Earl of Galloway. His mother was of Irish extraction, hailing from a County Kerry family. He was educated firstly at Brighton College, before attending Marlborough College in 1854. He left Marlborough in 1855 and proceeded to Winchester College. He was a prefect at Winchester, and captained the cricket eleven. He had an older brother, William Stewart, who was a first-class cricketer for Oxford University. The two once opposed one another on the cricket field, when Winchester College played Oxford.

== First-class cricket ==
Stewart played first-class cricket in 1869 for both Hampshire and the Marylebone Cricket Club (MCC). He made his first-class debut for the MCC against Oxford University at Oxford. Three further matches followed, two for the MCC against the South and Cambridge University, with his solitary appearance for Hampshire coming against the MCC at Lord's. In his four first-class matches, he scored 28 runs with a highest score of 8, in addition to taking two catches and making a single stumping. He was described by Haygarth in Scores and Biographies as a "free-hitting batsman". He would later captain the 3rd Dragoon Guards in inter-regimental matches, with his presence in the side making them hard to beat and earning him a reputation as one of the best amateur wicket-keepers in England.

== Military career ==
=== Early career ===
Having briefly considered a legal career, Stewart decided to pursue a military career and enlisted in the British Army, purchasing the rank of ensign with the 37th Foot in November 1863; he further purchased the rank of lieutenant in July 1865, and was appointed an adjutant in the regiment in July 1866. He served in British India with the 37th Foot, where he was stationed in Bengal during a severe epidemic of cholera. He served in India as aide-de-camp to Major-General William Beatson in Umballa, having been appointed in August 1868 and serving in that capacity until November 1870. Between March and August 1869, he had been permitted to return to England on leave of absence due to sickness. He returned to England in 1873, exchanging into the 3rd Dragoon Guards with the rank of captain. In 1877, he entered the staff college, passing out in 1878.

=== Service in Southern Africa ===
Following the Zulu victory at the Battle of Isandlwana, Stewart was dispatched to South Africa as a 'special service officer', where he partook in the remainder of the Anglo-Zulu War that concluded in July 1879. There, he was attached to the cavalry under the command of Major-General Frederick Marshall, and was mentioned in despatches. Stewart served as brigade major for the cavalry in the second invasion of Zululand and was present at the 5 June Zungeni Mountain skirmish. In June 1879 Stewart suggested to British commander Lord Chelmsford that rather than accompanying the slow-moving infantry and artillery column the cavalry brigade should race ahead and seize the Zulu capital of Ulundi. Chelmsford rejected this proposal; Stewart afterwards complained in a letter to the head of army intelligence, Major-General Sir Archibald Alison, that neither he nor Marshall understood Chelmsford's strategy for the war and that input from cavalry officers was not welcomed. During this period, despairing of his poor prospects for promotion, Stewart considered resigning from the army. The brigade was disbanded following the British victory at the Battle of Ulundi and Stewart afterwards served on the lines of communication.

In November 1879, he fought in the Second Sekhukhune War against Sekhukhune I of the Bapedi, having initially been ordered home; however, with George Pomeroy Colley being ordered to Afghanistan, Stewart remained in South Africa to succeed him as General Garnet Wolseley's chief-of-staff. He was made a brevet major the same month, in recognition of his services during the Anglo-Zulu war. Promotion to brevet lieutenant colonel followed in July 1880, in recognition of his service in the latter conflict, for which he was also mentioned in despatches. Wolseley used his influence to further Stewart's career and he became known as one of the Wolseley ring of officers, though he joined later than many whom Wolseley knew from service in the 1873–74 Third Anglo-Ashanti War.

Stewart took part in the First Boer War in 1881, serving under Major-General George Pomeroy Colley as assistant adjutant and quartermaster general. He was present at the British defeat in the Battle of Majuba Hill on 27 February 1881, that ended the war and resulted in the death of Colley; Stewart was taken prisoner after the battle by a Boer patrol, having attempted to evade capture, and was detained until the end of March. Following his release, he gained the substantive rank of major in July 1881, and in early 1882 he was appointed aide-de-camp to the Lord Lieutenant of Ireland, Earl Cowper. His appointment came during a period of tension following the murder of Lord Frederick Cavendish in Dublin.

=== Egypt and Mahdist War ===
In August 1882, he was placed on the staff as quarter-master general and assistant adjutant of Major-General Drury Drury-Lowe's cavalry division in Egypt during the Anglo-Egyptian War. There, he saw action in the engagements at El-Magfar, Tel-el-Mahuta, and Kassasin. Following the Battle of Tel-el-Kebir on 13 September 1882, he headed an advance upon Cairo, taking possession of both the town and citadel. Stewart was instrumental in securing the surrender of Ahmed Urabi following the capture of Cairo, gaining him one of his three despatch mentions in the conflict. In recognition of his war service, he was made a brevet colonel and an aide-de-camp to Queen Victoria. He was further honoured by being appointed a Companion of the Order of the Bath in November 1882, alongside being decorated by the Ottoman Empire with his appointment to the Order of Osmanieh, 3rd Class in the same month. He was also decorated with the Khedive's Bronze Star. He briefly returned to Ireland after the war to serve with the Viceroy, John Spencer, 5th Earl Spencer.

In January 1884, he was sent to Suakin on the Red Sea coast of Sudan to serve in the Mahdist War, where he commanded the cavalry under Sir Gerald Graham. There, he took part as a brevet brigadier-general in the actions from El Teb – where he personally led the charge – to the advance on Tamai. His services were recognised with him being knighted as a Knight Commander of the Order of the Bath in May 1884, and he was made assistant adjutant and quartermaster-general for the South-Eastern District of England from April to September 1884.

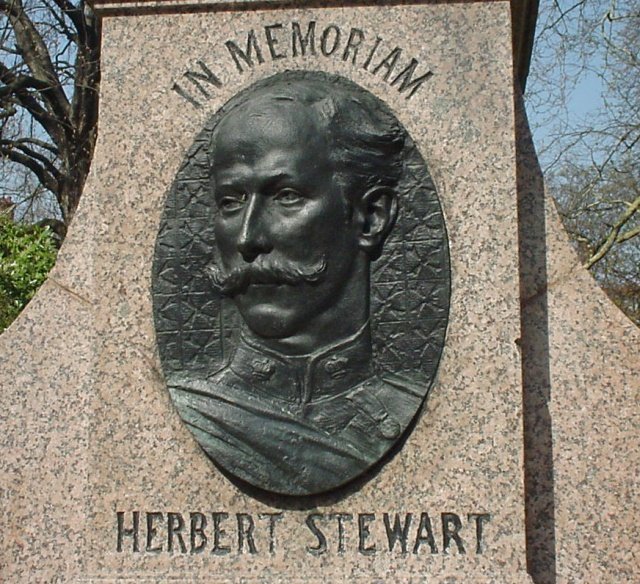
Medallion on the memorial to Stewart at Hans Place, London

Stewart then joined the expedition for the relief of Khartoum, with news having been received from General Charles Gordon that led to Lord Wolseley's decision to send a column across the desert of Metemmaand. Stewart was entrusted with the command of a cavalry brigade, again with the brevet rank of brigadier-general. On 16 January 1885, he found the Mahdi enemy in force near the wells of Abu Klea, and repulsed their fierce charge on the following morning, despite his horse being shot from under him. Leaving the wounded under guard, the column moved forward on 18 January through bushy country towards Metemma, 23 miles distant. Meanwhile, the enemy continued their attacks, and on the morning of 19 January, Stewart was wounded when he was shot in the abdomen during the Battle of Abu Kru and had to hand over command to Sir Charles Wilson, the intelligence officer. He was tended to in the aftermath of his wounding by his aide-de-camp, Frank Rhodes, and St Leger Herbert, with the latter being killed at his side.

=== Death ===
Stewart survived his wound for nearly a month, living long enough to hear of his promotion to the rank of major-general "for distinguished service in the field", with Lord Wolseley having personally recommended his promotion to Queen Victoria, who obliged; he was the youngest to hold the rank in the British Army at the time. He died on the way back from Khartoum to Korti on 16 February, and was buried near the wells of Jakdul. At the time of his death, his wife, Georgina, was en-route to nurse him. The daughter of the Royal Navy admiral Sir James Stirling, Stewart had married her in 1877; they had one son. He had his residence in London at Hans Place.

In the telegram reporting his death that announced to the House of Lords on 21 February, Lord Wolseley summed up both Stewart's character and career with the words: "No braver soldier or more brilliant leader of men ever wore the Queen's uniform." A similar sentiment was felt by the Duke of Cambridge, who wrote: "A finer soldier never existed in HM Service. He was a young officer, who by his own merits and his personal bravery had brought himself into a prominent position in the Army much earlier than usually happened in the ordinary course of events." A bronze relief panel was erected in St Paul's Cathedral, London; it was unveiled by Lord Wolseley in July 1888.

== Works cited ==
- Acović, Dragomir (2012). Slava i čast: Odlikovanja među Srbima, Srbi među odlikovanjima (in Serbian). Belgrade: Službeni Glasnik. ISBN 978-8-6519-1750-2.
- Beaver, Alfred (1892). Memorials of Old Chelsea. London: E. Stock. OCLC 11405520.
- Chisholm, Hugh, ed. (1911). "Stewart, Sir Herbert" . Encyclopædia Britannica. Vol. 25 (11th ed.). Cambridge University Press. OCLC 1000932947.
- Dauglish, M. G.; Wainewright, John Bannerman (1907). Winchester College, 1836–1906: A Register. Winchester: P. and G. Wells. OCLC 15513415.
- George, HRH Duke of Cambridge (1906). Egar Sheppard (ed.). George, A Memoir of his Private Life: Based on the Journals and Correspondence of His Highness. Vol. 2. London: Longmans & Co. OCLC 11933239.
- Greaves, Adrian; Knight, Ian (2006). Who's Who in the Zulu War, 1879: The British. Barnsley, South Yorkshire: Pen & Sword. ISBN 1-84415-479-3.
- Haygarth, Arthur (1876). Scores and Biographies. Vol. 6. London: Longmans & Co. OCLC 1454929184.
- Kochanski, Halik (1999). Sir Garnet Wolseley: Victorian Hero. London: A & C Black. ISBN 978-1-8528-5188-0.
- Lloyd, Ernest Marsh (1898). "Stewart, Herbert" . Dictionary of National Biography. Vol. 54. London: Smith, Elder & Co. OCLC 669699103.
- Manning, Stephen (2022). Britain Against the Xhosa and Zulu Peoples: Lord Chelmsford's South African Campaigns. Barsnley: Pen and Sword Military. ISBN 978-1-3990-1057-3.
- Marlborough College Register from 1843 to 1904 (5 ed.). Oxford: H. Hart. 1905. OCLC 18234600.
- Matthews, H. J., ed. (1886). Brighton College Register (PDF). Brighton: J. Farncombe. OCLC 927760099.
- Paul, James Balfour, ed. (1907). The Scots Peerage. Vol. 4. Edinburgh: David Douglas. OCLC 505064285.
- Sabben-Clare, James (1981). Winchester College after 600 Years, 1382–1982. Southampton: Paul Cave Publications. ISBN 978-0-8614-6023-6.
- Sinclair, W. (1909). Memorials of St Paul's Cathedral. London: Chapman & Hall. OCLC 4469418.
- Symons, Julian (2014). England's Pride. Leeds: House of Stratus. ISBN 978-0-7551-4829-5.
- Wilkinson, Osborn; Wilkinson, Johnson (1896). The Memoirs of the Gemini Generals (2 ed.). London: A.D. Innes. OCLC 292387.
