= Charles Wilson (British Army officer) =

British army officer and explorer (1836–1905)

Major-General Sir Charles Wilson KCB KCMG FRS FRGS
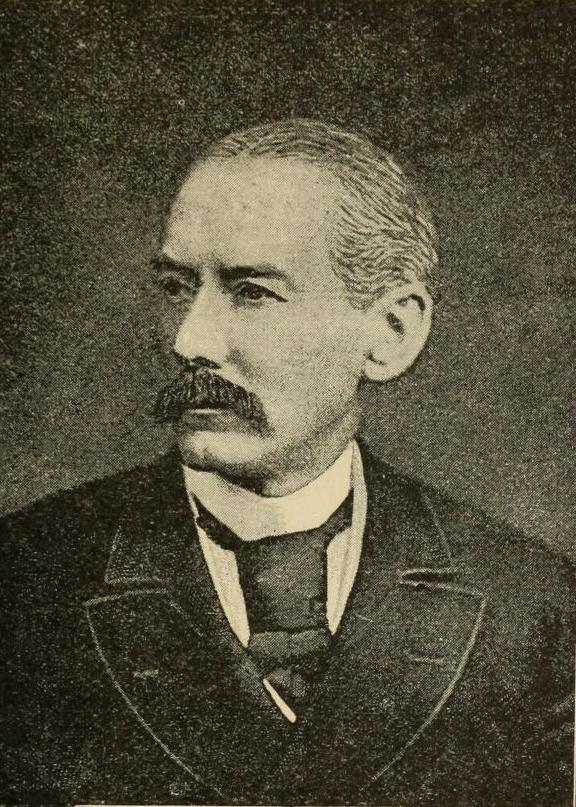
- Born: 14 March 1836; Liverpool
- Died: 25 October 1905 (aged 69); Tunbridge Wells
- Spouse: Olivia Duffin (m. 1867–1905)
- Military career
- Service years: 1855–1898
- Rank: Major-General
- Unit: Royal Engineers
- Commands: Ordnance Survey
- Conflicts: Anglo-Egyptian War; Mahdist War; Nile Expedition

Major-General Sir Charles William Wilson KCB KCMG FRS FRGS (14 March 1836 – 25 October 1905) was a British Army officer, geographer and archaeologist.

== Early life and career ==
He was born in Liverpool on 14 March 1836 to Edward Wilson, at one time High Sheriff of Pembrokeshire. He was the uncle of Edward Adrian Wilson, the polar explorer, through his elder brother, Edward Thomas Wilson.

He was educated at the Liverpool Collegiate School and Cheltenham College. He attended the Royal Military Academy, Woolwich and was commissioned as an officer in the Royal Engineers in 1855.

His first appointment was as secretary to the British Boundary Commission in 1858, whose duty it was to map the 49th parallel between the Rocky Mountains and the Pacific Ocean. He spent four years in North America, during which time he documented his travels in a diary, the transcription of which can be found in "Mapping the Frontier" edited by George F. G. Stanley.

== Palestine ==
Charles William Wilson; Ordnance Survey of Jerusalem. 1865

In 1864 he started working on the Ordnance Survey of Jerusalem funded by the wealthy Angela Burdett-Coutts, 1st Baroness Burdett-Coutts whose primary motivation was to find better drinking water for those living in the city. During the resulting search, he produced the most accurate map of Jerusalem and identified the eponymous Wilson's Arch but was unable to find a new source of water. According to a book published in 2013, "Wilson was the first to pay proper scholarly attention to the stonework of the Haram el-Sharif (Temple Mount) walls when [conducting] the first comprehensive mapping of the Old City (the Ordnance Survey of Jerusalem)". Over a century after Wilson's work, The Jerusalem Post commented that his efforts "on the Jerusalem Ordnance Survey served as the basis for all future Jerusalem research".

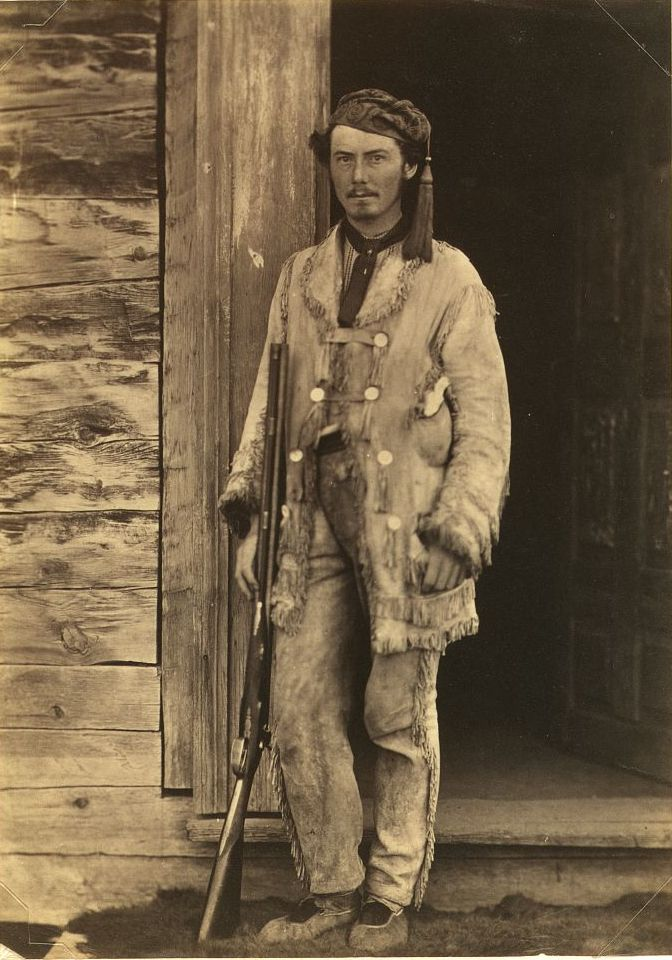
Charles Wilson, sometime between 1858 and 1861

In 1867, with the Palestine Exploration Fund, Wilson had a leading role in the PEF Survey of Palestine and conducted one of the first major Excavations at the Temple Mount in Jerusalem. In 1868 he joined the Ordnance Survey of Sinai. In 1872 he was elected to the Society of British Archaeology.

He served as director of the Palestine Pilgrims' Text Society, an organization publishing texts and translations related to pilgrimages to the Holy Land. He was chairman of the Palestine Exploration Fund from 1901 until his death in 1905.

== Scotland and other appointments ==
After returning home, Wilson was appointed to the Ordnance Survey of Scotland in 1867 and also acted as Assistant Commissioner on the Borough Boundary Commission. In 1874 he became a Fellow of the Royal Society. He became director of the topographical department at the British War Office and assistant quartermaster-general in the British Intelligence Department. In 1876 he received an Order of the Bath. He then headed the Ordnance Survey of Ireland.

== Turkey ==
From 1879 to 1882, he was consul-general in Anatolia and travelled extensively in Turkey. It was in this period that he found the Sidamara Sarcophagus. In the summer of 1882, he took part in Garnet Wolseley's expedition to put down the rebellion of Colonel 'Urabi. During that time, he edited the multi-volume set Picturesque Palestine, Sinai, and Egypt.

== Khartoum ==
From 1884 to 1885, Wilson, with a rank of Colonel, took part in the Khartoum Relief Expedition, commanded by Garnet Wolseley. He was intelligence officer attached to the Desert Column led by Sir Herbert Stewart.

Desert Column was ordered to strike from Korti, across the Bayuda Desert, to Metemma where Gordon's armed steamers were awaiting them. Wilson's orders were to embark one of the steamers and reach Khartoum where he could confer with Gordon "both upon the military and upon the political position". After that he was to return to Metemma and report to Wolseley. He was also ordered to parade small detachment of British soldiers in traditional red tunics, to boost morale of the defenders, but not to leave any of them in Khartoum.

After Stewart was mortally wounded just before the Battle of Abu Kru, Wilson, an intelligence officer with little combat experience, suddenly found himself in command of the whole Desert Column, about 1,400 men. Under his command the British square won the Battle of Abu Kru and reached Nile.

On 21 January near Metemma they linked with Gordon's steamers.

After making necessary preparations for the safety of Desert Column left at Metemma, Wilson and his party of 28 British soldiers and officers (and some 150 natives) boarded two of Gordon's steamers, Talahawiyeh and Bordein, and started for Khartoum on 24 January.

The small convoy reached Khartoum in the afternoon of 28 January 1885. It came two days too late: Khartoum had been seized by the Mahdists in the early hours of 26 January. Between 5,000 and 10,000 inhabitants were slaughtered, among them Major-General Charles George Gordon. On return to Metemma Talahawiyeh struck rock and sunk; Bordein also struck rock but was beached at Mernat island. After several tense days Wilson and his party were saved by Captain Charles Beresford aboard armed steamer Safieh. Wilson received criticism afterwards for his delay in sailing to Khartoum, with one author stating that he had "lost any nerve he had ever possessed". Other sources however, spread the blame, particularly on the commander, Garnet Wolseley, 1st Viscount Wolseley who had already accused Wilson. The public in England also blamed Prime Minister William Gladstone for not having taken steps to relieve the siege of Khartoum and some historians have held Major-General Gordon responsible, because he had refused the order to evacuate while that was still possible.

== Ireland ==
Wilson was appointed director of the Ordnance Survey in Ireland and was director-general from 1886 to 1894.

== Later life ==
From 1895 until his retirement in 1898, Wilson served as the director-general of military education.

He was the editor of "Handbook for Travellers in Asia Minor, Transcaucasia, Persia, etc." in 1895. In the book, he gave encyclopedic information about the societies in Anatolia, Kurdistan, Transcaucasia, Syria, Mesopotamia and Iran and many settlements in this geography.

He died on 25 October 1905 at Tunbridge Wells. A subsequent biography on Wilson, by Sir Charles Moore Watson, said that he "probably did more than any other man to increase the knowledge of the geography and archeology of Asia Minor, Palestine and the adjacent countries".

== Published work ==
- Wilson, Charles W. (1906). Golgotha and The Holy Sepulchre. London: The Committee of the Palestine Exploration Fund. Good text scan, but with blurred illustrations and captions; or here, a darker scan, but with fully visible illustrations.
