= Battle of Abu Kru =

1885 battle of the British Sudan campaign

- Part of the Mahdist War
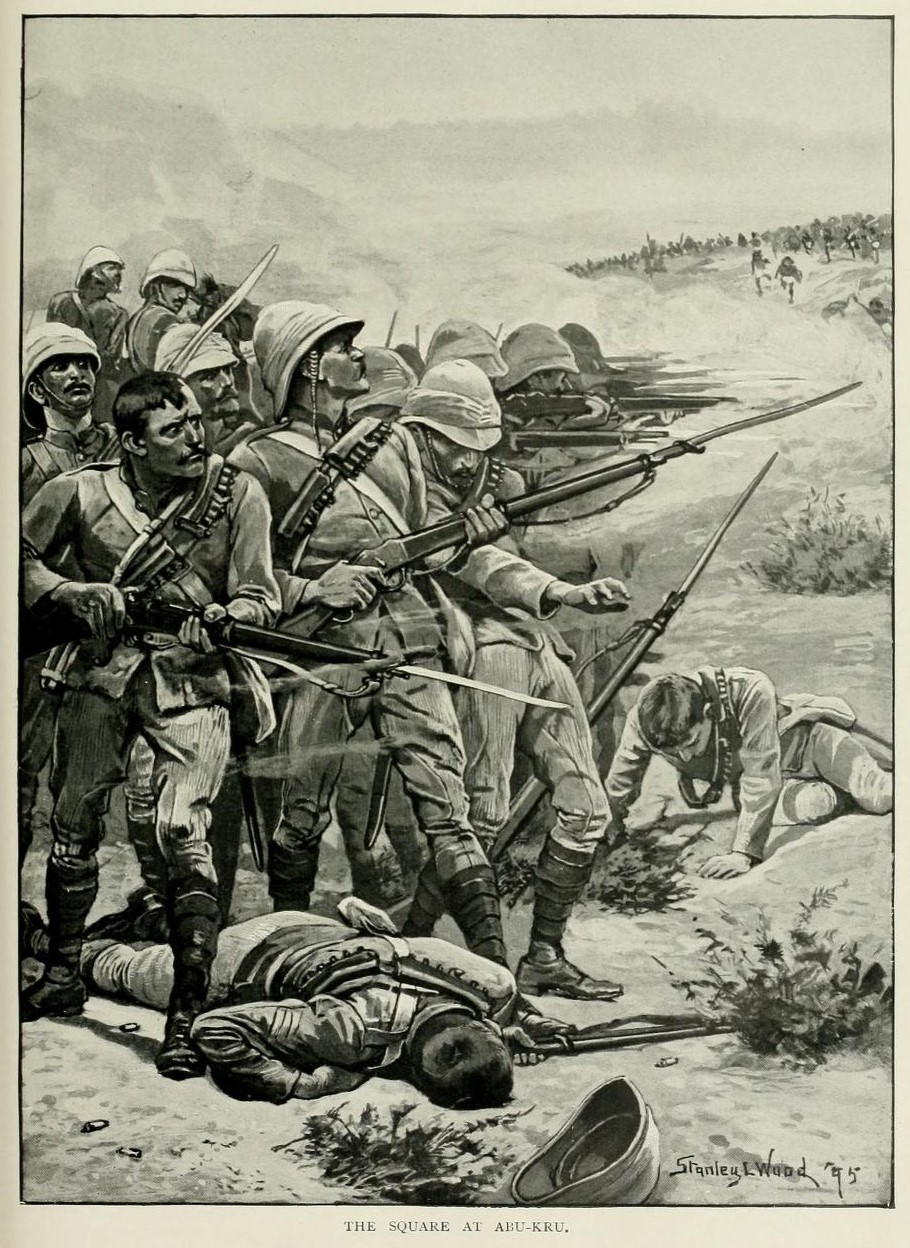
- Stanley L. Woodː The square at Abu-Kru (Battles of the nineteenth century, 1901)
Date	January 19, 1885
Location	Khartoum, Sudan
Result	British victory

Belligerents
United Kingdom	Mahdist Sudan

Commanders and leaders
Herbert Stewart † Charles Wilson	Muhammad Ahmad

Strength
1,200	13,000–14,000

Casualties and losses
121	Unknown, likely higher than the British casualties

The Battle of Abu Kru (also known as the Battle of Gubat) was part of the British Sudan campaign. It was fought on 19 January 1885, two days after the Battle of Abu Klea, between the British and the Mahdists. The British force under Brigadier General Sir Herbert Stewart numbered 1,200 while a large number of Mahdists, probably around 13,000–14,000, were in pursuit. The British were moving to rescue General Gordon from Khartoum, and were cutting the Great Bend of the Nile, when they came under attack a short distance from rejoining the Nile.

== Prelude to battle ==
After the victory at Abu Klea, Stewart and his column spent the 18th preparing for the final advance to the Nile. The column resumed its march at sunset, so as to march in the cool of the night. On the morning of the 19th, the column came under fire near the village of Abu Kru.

== Battle ==
The British began the action by constructing a fortified Zareba. After taking casualties, most important among them, Stewart, it was decided by the second-in-command, Sir Charles Wilson, the intelligence officer of the column, to leave the relative safety of the zareba and make for the bank of the Nile. The 19th Hussars, Naval Brigade, Royal Artillery and half the Heavy Camel unit were to stay in the zareba.

Upon leaving the zareba, the British formed a square, and continued moving towards the Nile, repelling all attacks until they reached the river.

A corporal of the column described the scene in a letter published in The Daily Telegraph on 12 March 1885:

a beautiful little square this time; all infantry. Received charge without a wave in any ﬂank. Enemy fell like rotten sheep. Glorious time. Fight over by sunset, 19th inst., (Note: 19th instant, which is an alternative manner of saying day of the month.) no moon, marched on to river, about half a mile in the dark, rather dangerous proceedings, but had to be done.

— Corporal F.H. Middleton

== Aftermath ==
The British losses were 121, including Stewart, who was mortally wounded in the stomach during the early part of the battle and was obliged to turn command over to Colonel Wilson. The majority of casualties occurred when the column was formed into a square and met the Mahdists in the open.The Mahdist losses are unknown but thought to be considerably higher.

After reaching the Nile at Metemmah, Wilson and 240 soldiers were conveyed to Khartoum by steamboat; however, they arrived two days after the fall of Khartoum and the death of Gordon.
