= Keeper of the Mausoleum (1903) =

Ottoman Painting

- Türbenin Bekçisi (Turkish)
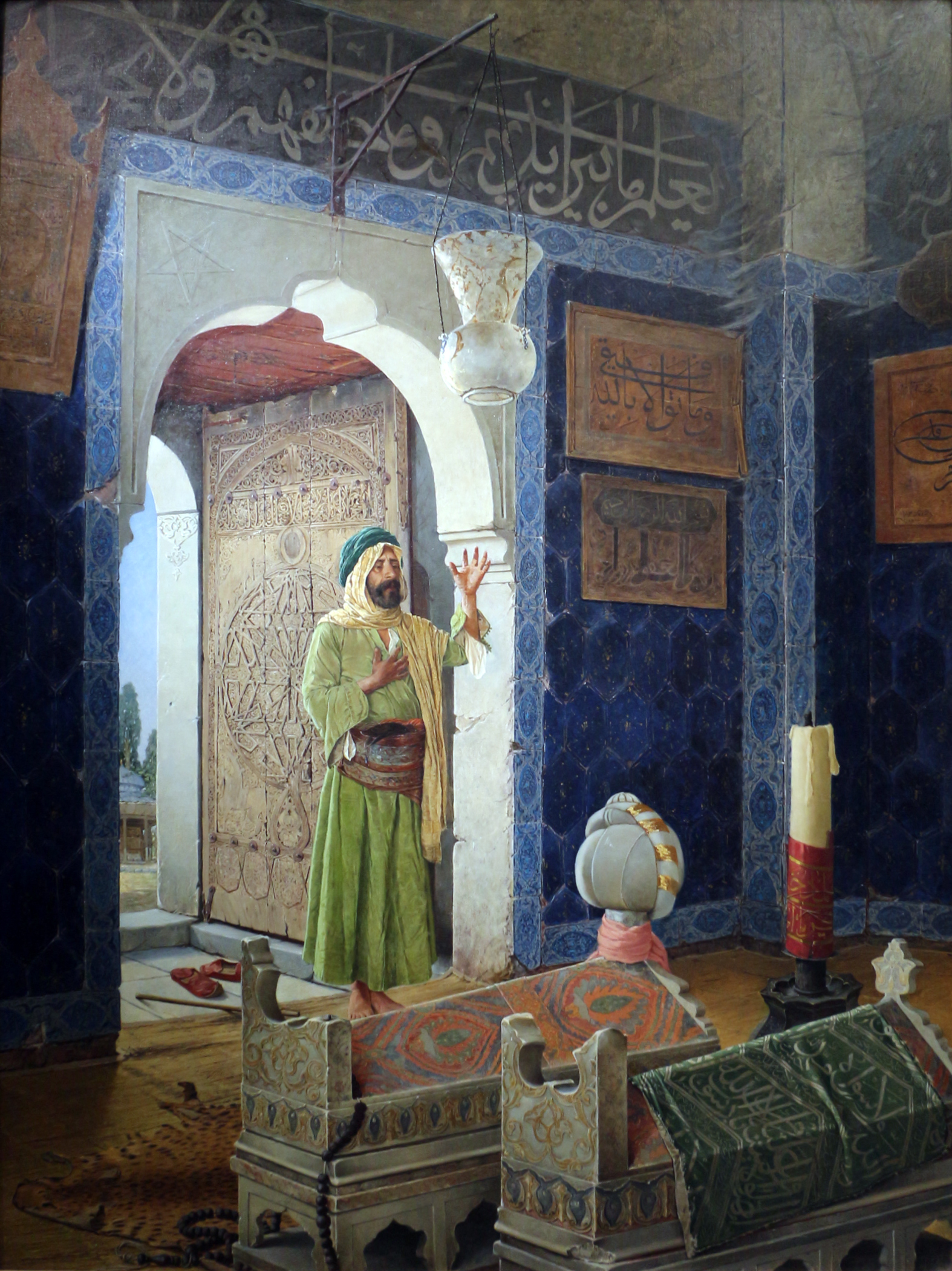
- Artist: Osman Hamdi Bey
- Year: 1903
- Medium: Oil on canvas
- Dimensions: 202 cm × 150.7 cm (80 in × 59.3 in)
- Location: Musee d'Orsay; Paris

Keeper of the Mausoleum (Turkish: Türbenin Bekçisi) also known as Old man in front of children's graves or Old man in front of children's tombs is a 1903 painting by Osman Hamdi Bey (1842-1910).

== Description ==
The painting depicts a man in traditional Ottoman religious costume: a long green garment belted at the waist, a yellow scarf, and a blue Turkish turban. The figure may be a self-portrait of Hamdi himself. The costume predates the introduction of the fez and the spread of Western style dress with the Tanzimat reforms in the mid-19th century. The man's costume suggests he may be a Dervish.

The man is standing in the archway of an Ottoman-style mausoleum before two cenotaphs, with alternate titles suggesting the tombs belong to children.

== Historical context ==
Osman Hamdi Bey was a prominent painter, educator, legislator, archeologist, and museum administrator in Constantinople. Some scholars interpret the painting as a museological metaphor: the relationship between the dervish and the cenotaphs is a link between Osman Hamdi, director of the Imperial Museum, and the Lycian sarcophagus of Sidon he had unearthed in the excavation of the Ayaa Necropolis in 1887.

"Like numerous excavations in the 19th century, the Sidon excavation was aimed at extracting the sarcophagi to include it in the museum's collection in Constantinople...The Sidon excavation is part of resistant measures of Ottoman archaeologists like Osman Hamdi Bey against European and American cultural imperialistic exploitation of the cultural assets from the Ottoman Empire."

As such, the work could be viewed as a message promoting the preservation of the Ottoman heritage. Hamdi reveals himself as someone with great respect for the Ottoman past through an alter ego specifically charged with the maintenance of a tomb, and thereby of memory. The painting presents his maintenance of Ottoman cenotaphs as a metaphor for the preservation of Greco-Roman sarcophagi in the museum, and represents this as preservation of Ottoman heritage.

== Versions ==
The painting was produced in two versions, both of which were exhibited in Europe. The first was displayed at the 1903 Paris Salon, with the rather explicit name of Derviche au turbey des enfants, translated as Dervish at the Children's Tomb. In 1909, a second version was shown at the Royal Academy Exhibition in London under the shorter name of Le tombeau des enfants (The Children's Tomb). Both of these names were based on a straightforward description of the scene, with a choice to emphasize the age of the deceased.
