= Bronze Age necropolis of Byblos =

Bronze Age necropolis in Lebanon

- Interactive map of Bronze Age necropolis of Byblos
- 34.1185°N 35.6475°E

History
- Built for: Resting place of the Gebalite elite

Site notes
- Governing body: Lebanese Directorate General of Antiquities

The Bronze Age necropolis of Byblos is a group of eight Bronze Age underground rock-cut tombs that were discovered undisturbed in Byblos (modern Jbeil), a coastal city in Lebanon, and one of the oldest continuously populated cities in the world.

== Location ==
Located 33 km (21 mi) north of Beirut, ancient Byblos/Gebal (modern name: Jbeil/Gebeil) lies south of the city's medieval center. It sits on a seaside promontory consisting of two hills separated by a dell. A 22 m (72 ft) deep well provided the settlement with fresh water. The highly defensible archeological tell of Byblos is flanked by two harbors that were used for sea trade. The entrances to the Bronze Age necropolis of Byblos is located just outside the southern gate of the ancient acropolis. This area revealed a series of rock-cut tombs extending beneath the walls of the sacred precinct, towards the large temple complexes.

== History and excavation ==
Byblos (Jbeil), a city listed as a UNESCO World Heritage Site since 1984, has been continuously inhabited since the Neolithic period _around nine thousand years. During the Middle Bronze Age (the second millennium BC), Byblos experienced intense commercial activity and cultural interaction with Ancient Egypt.

The necropolis was uncovered during archaeological excavations begun in 2019. The discovery was made while researchers were investigating a previously unexplored area of the ancient acropolis of Byblos. From 2019 and for three consecutive years, excavations were carried out, in collaboration with the French archaeologist Julien Chanteau from the Louvre Museum. The underground tombs, known as hypogea, were carved into the soft rock and arranged both side by side and stacked vertically, connected by passages and staircases. The tombs were the subject of a documentary by Philippe Aractingi and Jonas Rosales, titled Lebanon, Secrets of the Kingdom of Byblos (Liban, les secrets du Royaume de Byblos), broadcast on Arte.

== Description ==
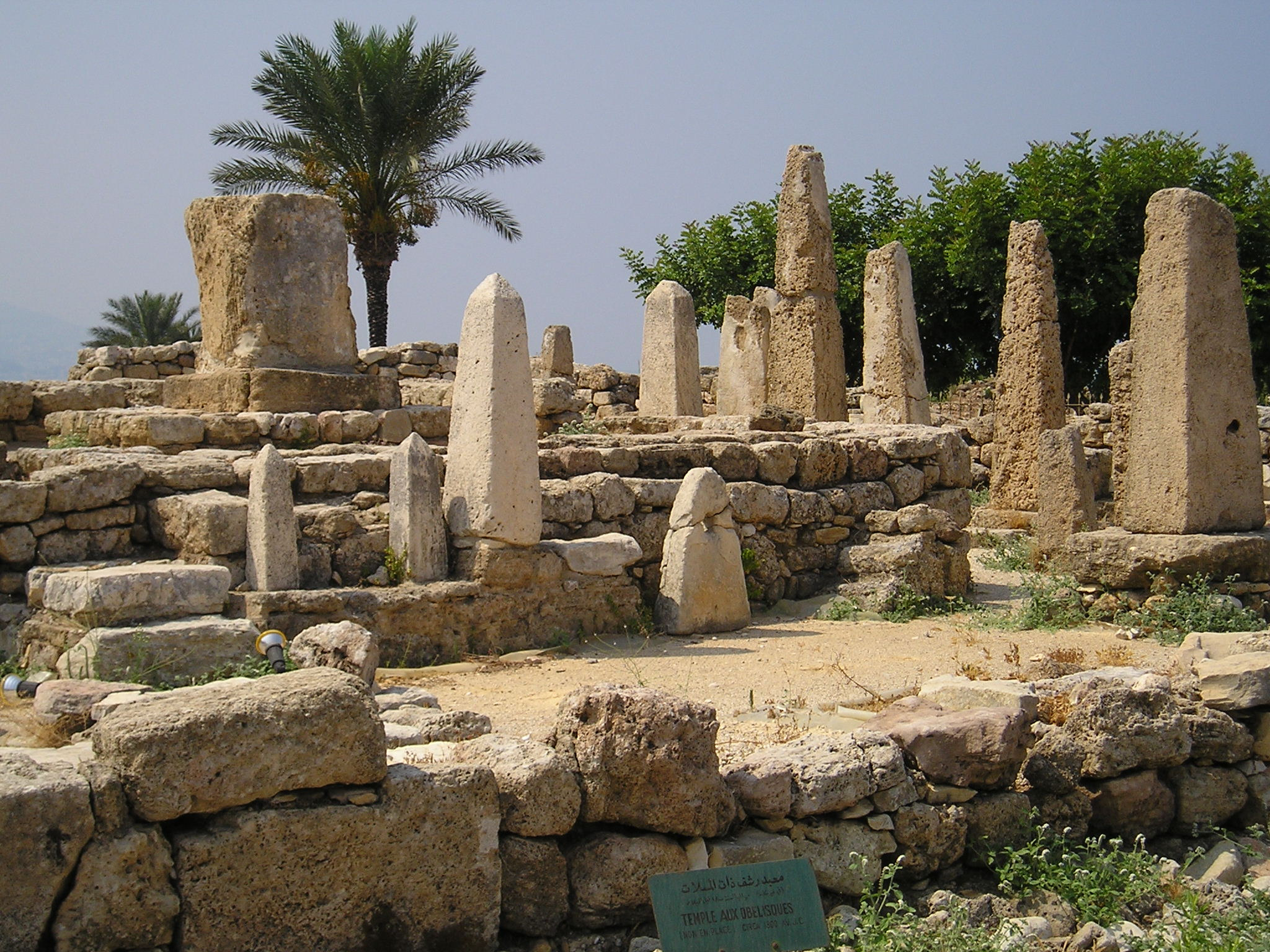
Remains of the Temple of the Obelisks, Byblos.

The necropolis consists of a series of undisturbed interconnected underground rock-cut tombs. Zaven and Chanteau interpret the hypogea as burials associated with the elite of Middle Bronze Age Byblos. The tombs were placed just outside the sacred acropolis, where the temples and royal palaces were located, but extended beneath the walls towards the temple complexes. This positioning was intentional, as it allowed the elite to be buried as close as possible to their rulers. Zaven and Chanteau have discussed the tombs' relationship to the nearby Temple of the Obelisks and the possibility of a funerary or ancestral cult.

== Dating and finds ==
The necropolis dates back to the Bronze Age, a period during which Byblos was a thriving trade hub, particularly known for its export of Lebanese cedar wood to Egypt. The tombs have yielded numerous valuable and finely crafted artifacts. Historical finds recovered during the last few years from the "elite tombs" support evidence of this commercial and cultural exchange with Ancient Egypt.

== See also ==
- Royal necropolis of Ayaa – Phoenician necropolis in Lebanon
- Royal necropolis of Byblos – Phoenician necropolis in Lebanon
