= Sarcophagus of the Satrap =

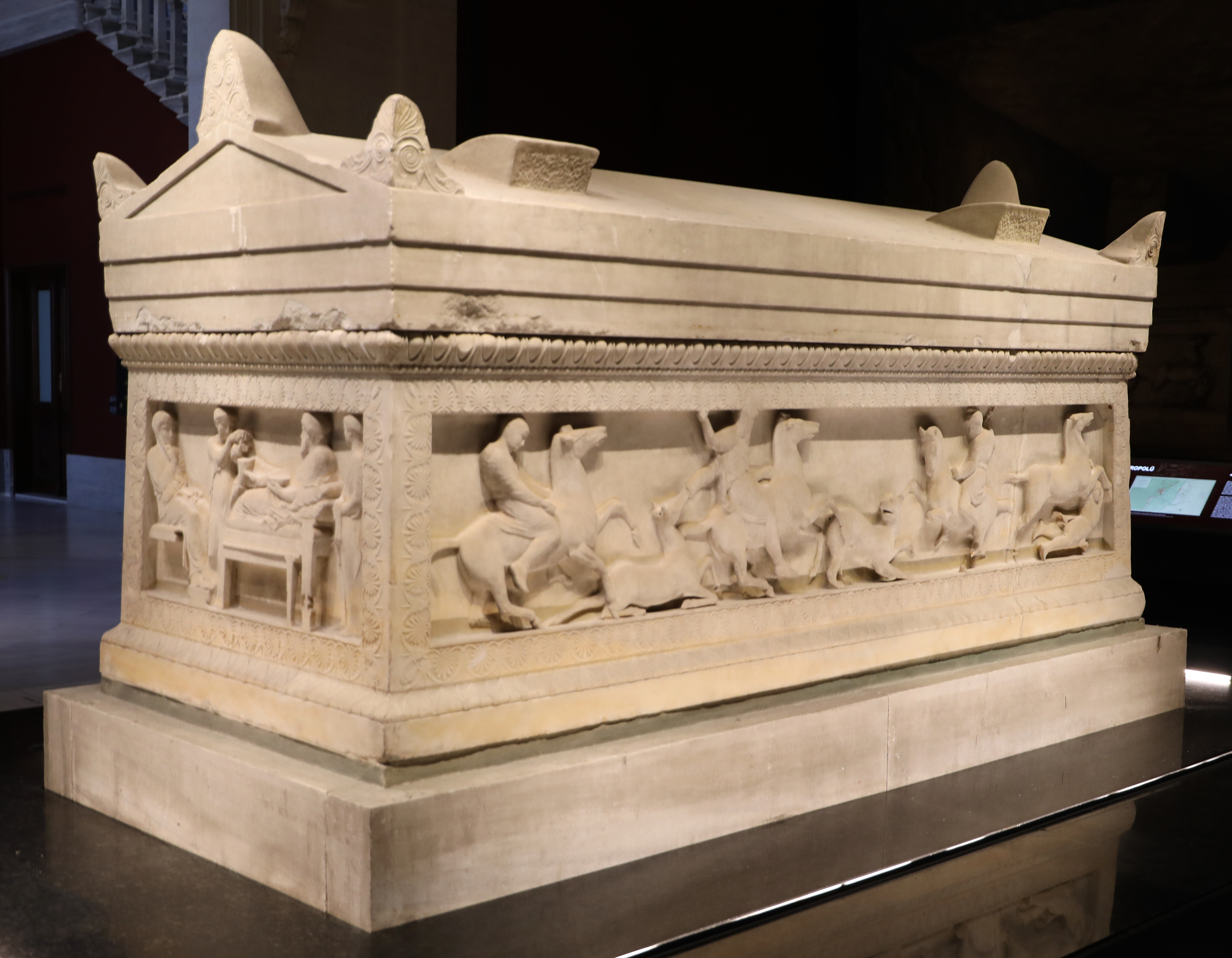
The Sarcophagus of the Satrap at the Istanbul Archaeology Museums, showing the hunt scene.

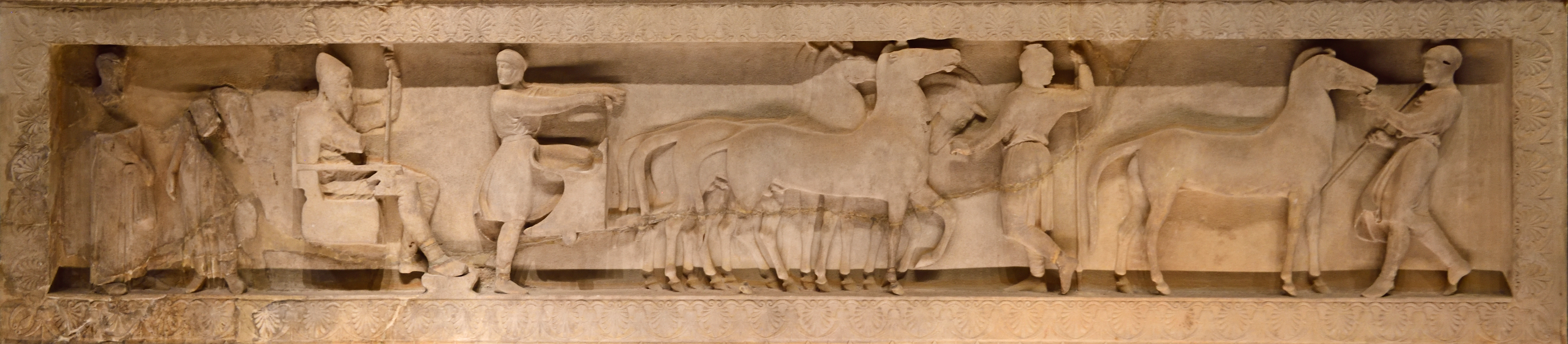
The other long side: The Satrap about to go on a journey

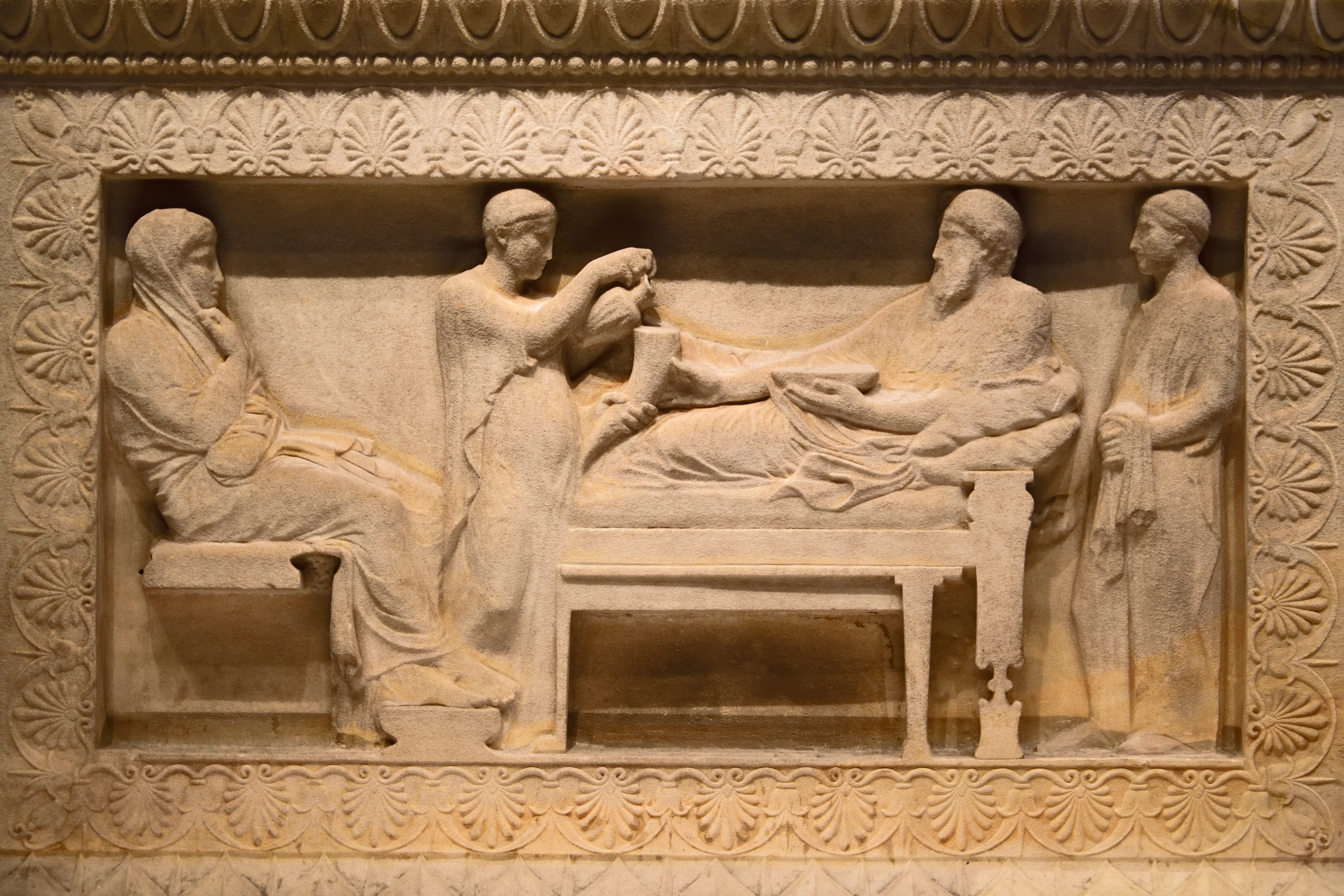
Short side: The Satrap banqueting with wife

The Sarcophagus of the Satrap is an ancient marble funerary monument discovered at the Ayaa Necropolis in Sidon, present-day Lebanon, and is believed to originate from the Achaemenid Persian Empire period (the mid-5th century BCE). The reliefs are believed to depict a Persian Satrap, whose body is assumed to have inhabited the tomb.

It holds historical significance for its artistic craftsmanship and cultural insights, particularly the cultural mixing in the area at the time, between Greek, Persian and Levantine cultures.

It is currently at the Istanbul Archaeology Museums.

== Scenes ==
The primary artistic feature is the intricate bas-reliefs on the sides of the sarcophagus: a banquet scene on one end, and a journey scene and a hunt scene on either of the two long sides. The banquet scene, where the satrap is reclining on a lavish couch, partaking in feasting and merrymaking, shows the satrap depicted regally, alluding to his high status. His exact identity remains a matter of historical debate.

Scholars offer various interpretations of the banquet scene. Some suggest it represents the satrap's celebration of his earthly life and his perceived divine power in the afterlife. Others argue it simply portrays indigenous nobles enjoying life.

Ornamental details, such as the palmettes and lotus flowers, are considered to align with Ionic decorative motifs.

It is considered to reflects interactions between Greek and Persian cultures in the ancient Mediterranean world.

== Bibliography ==
- Kleemann, Ilse (1958). Der Satrapen-Sarkophag Aus Sidon. Istanbuler Forschungen (in German). Gebr. Mann.
- Strong, Donald Emrys (1959). "Ilse Kleemann: Der Satrapen-Sarkophag aus Sidon". Gnomon. 31 (8). Verlag C.H.Beck: 689–693. ISSN 0017-1417. JSTOR 27682159.
- Hamdy Bey, Osman; Reinach, Théodore (1892a). Une nécropole royale à Sidon : fouilles de Hamdy Bey. Texte [A royal necropolis in Sidon: excavations of Hamdy Bey. Plates] (in French). Paris: Ernest Leroux. doi:10.11588/DIGLIT.5197.
- Hamdy Bey, Osman; Reinach, Théodore (1892b). Une nécropole royale à Sidon : fouilles de Hamdy Bey. Planches [A royal necropolis in Sidon: excavations of Hamdy Bey. Plates] (in French). Paris: Ernest Leroux. doi:10.11588/DIGLIT.5198.
- Reinach, Théodore (1892). "Les sarcophages de Sidon au Musée de Constantinople". Gazette des Beaux-Arts (in French). J. Claye: 177 ff.
- Joubin, André [in French] (1893). Catalogue sommaire [des] monuments funéraires [du] Musée Imperial Ottoman (in French). Mihran imprimeur.
- Mendel, Gustave [in French] (1912). Musées impériaux ottomans. Catalogue des sculptures grecques, romaines et byzantines. [135 photogr. illustrating the catalogue. With 72 photogr. of other exhibits] (in French). En vente au Musée Impérial.
