= Sarcophagus of the mourning women =

4th-century BC Roman sarcophagus

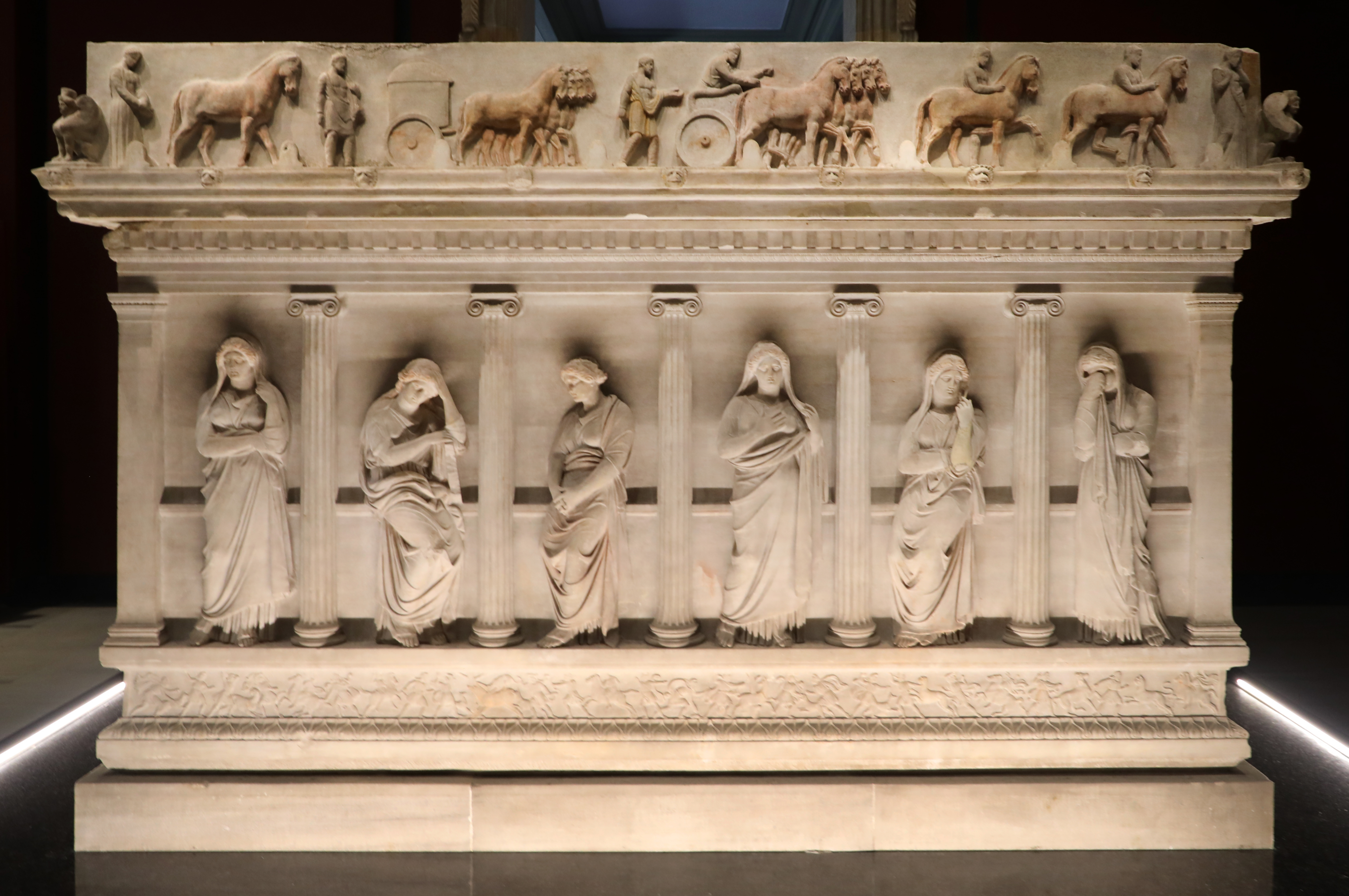
A long side

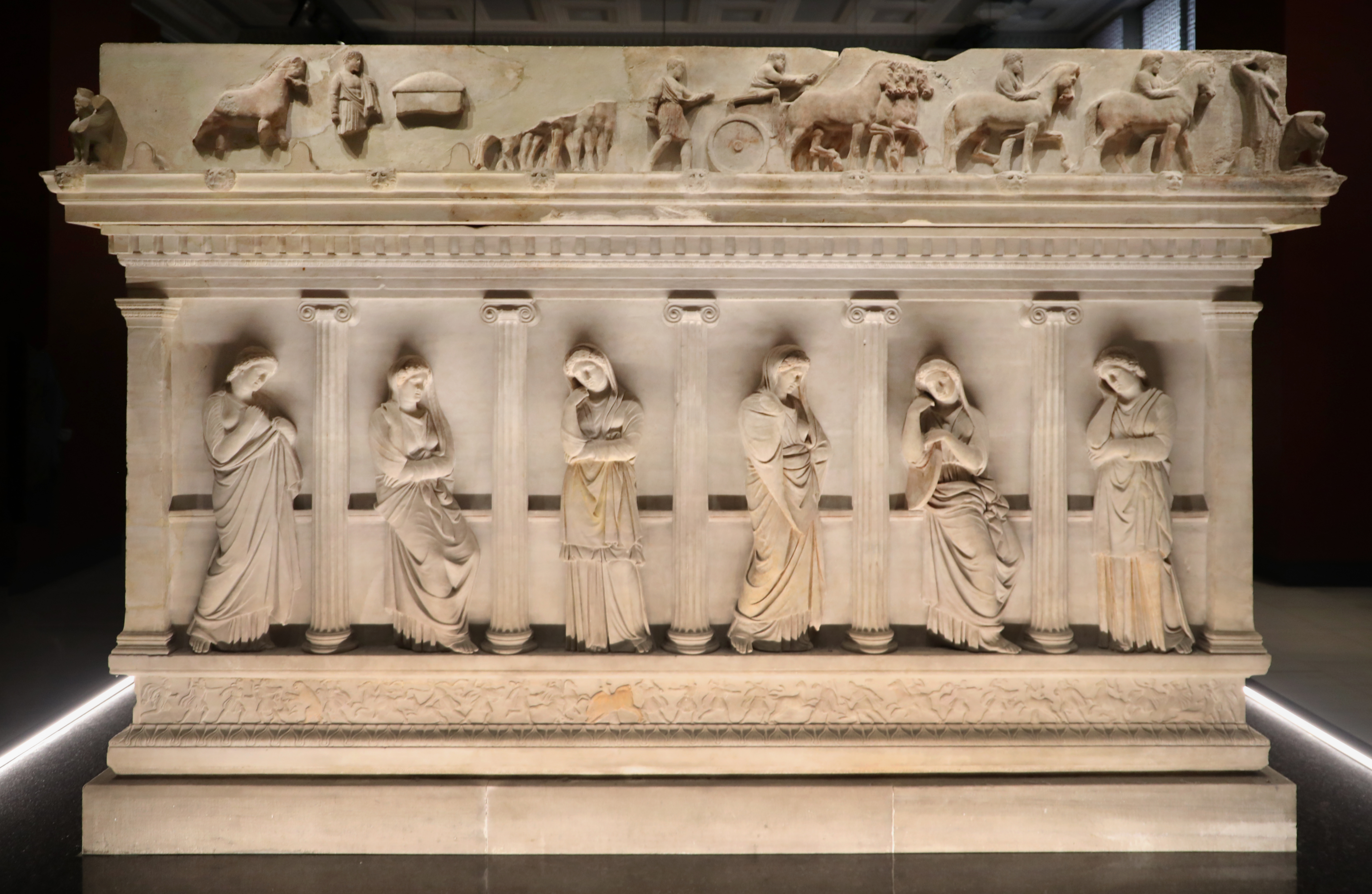
A long side

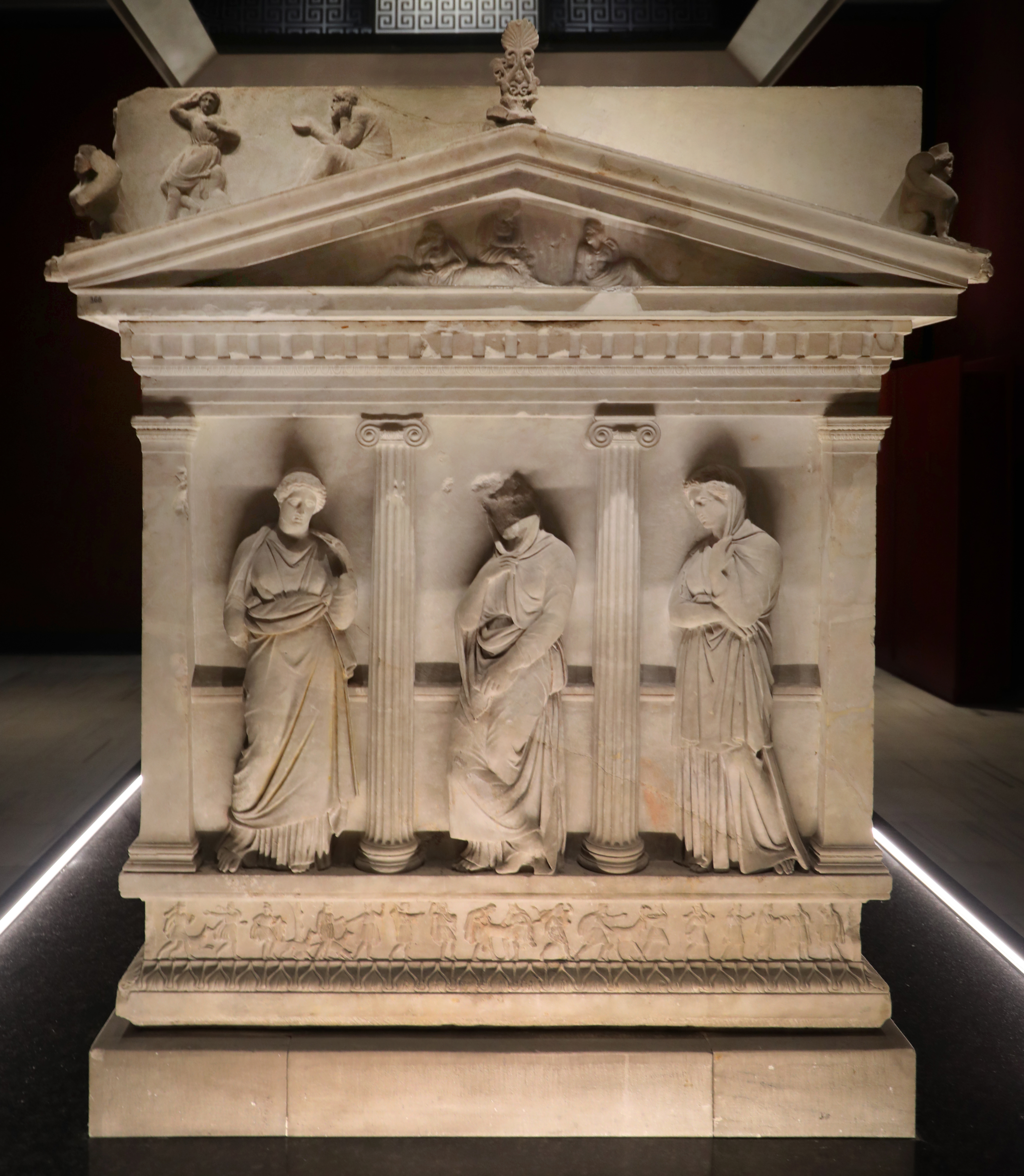
A short side

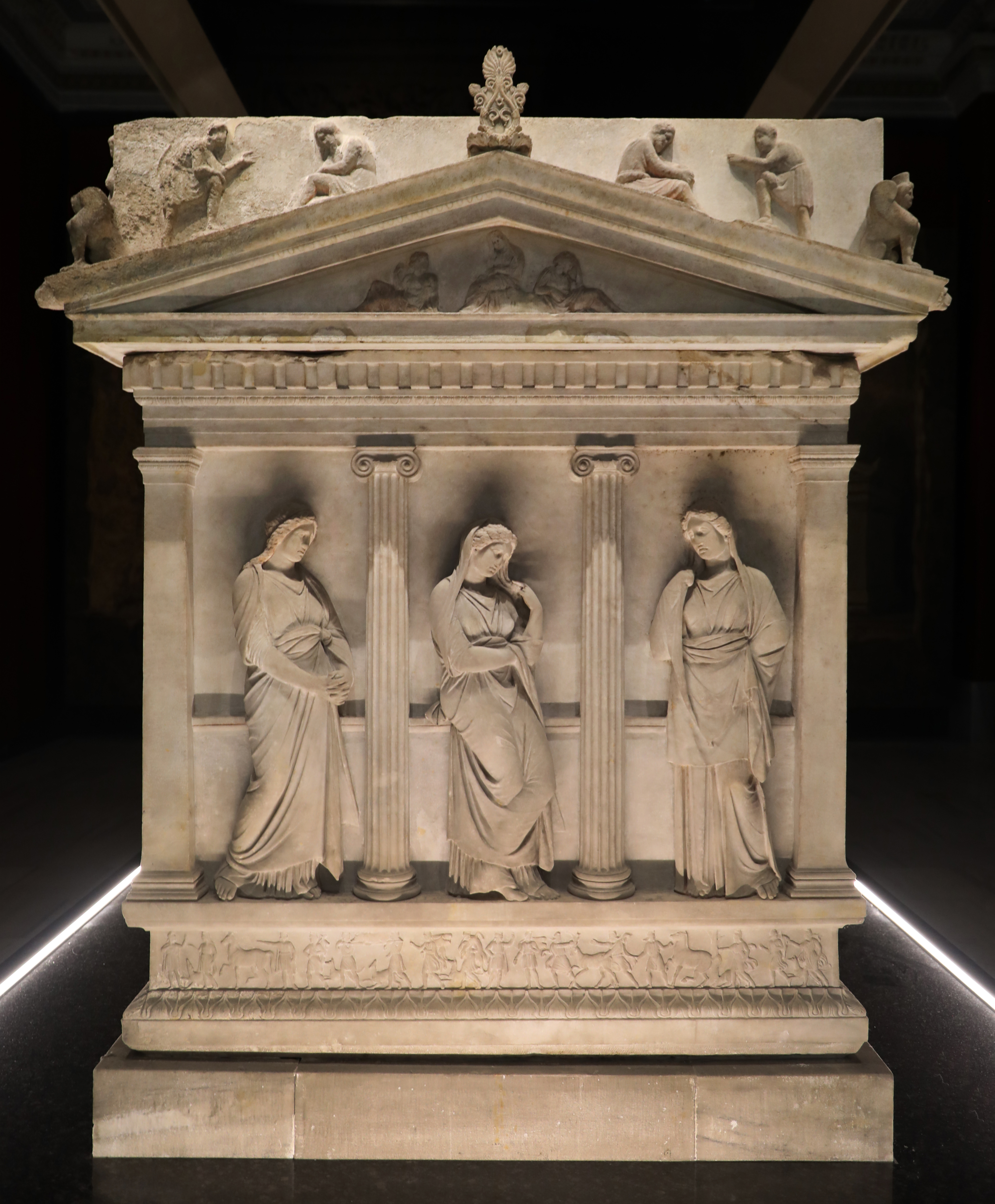
A short side

The Sarcophagus of the mourning women (in French Le Tombeau des Pleureuses) is a Hellenistic sarcophagus found in 1887 by the Ottoman archaeologist Osman Hamdi Bey, in the Royal necropolis of Ayaa near Sidon, Lebanon, in the same burial chamber (funerary room No. 3 of the necropolis of the King of Sidon) as the Alexander sarcophagus.

This columned sarcophagus from the pre-Roman period, a work of the Hellenistic period, is believed to be that of Strato, king of Sidon, who died in 360 BC. It is on display at the Istanbul Archaeological Museum.

== History ==
The sarcophagus had a great impact in Europe and America at the time of its discovery, along with twenty other sarcophagi from the Royal necropolis of Ayaa in Sidon. The sarcophagus, looted prior to its discovery, contained only the bones of the deceased and a bronze belt buckle.

When the sarcophagi from Sidon were brought to Istanbul, it became necessary to build a museum to house them. The facade of the main building, built by Osman Hamdi Bey according to the plans of the architect Alexandre Vallaury, one of the teachers of Sanayi-i Nefise Mektebi, is inspired by the sarcophagus of the Mourners. This is one of the reasons the museum was first named the "Museum of Sarcophagi".

== Description ==
The height of the sarcophagus of the Mourners is 2.97 m, its length 2.54 m and its width 1.37 m. It is one of the best preserved ancient sarcophagi in the world. The reliefs represent a funeral procession and women mourning the death of the king. It is estimated that several sculptors worked on this carved set. The sarcophagus has the shape and proportions of an Ionic temple. It is a good example of the oriental influence on the art of Hellenistic sculpture.

There are eighteen female figures, some standing and others seated, alternating with the Ionic columns that line the tank. The women all have a painful expression in their attitudes, but their movements differ from each other, bringing the whole work to life. Shaved heads, bare feet, torn clothes, movements and expressions of the characters reflecting their sadness are characteristic of Semitic communities. The eighteen female figures spread among the columns are thought to represent the wives of the dead or the women of their harem rather than the mourners common in Middle Eastern societies.

A funerary scene appears on the frieze above the sarcophagus. It is a composition that can give an idea of the customs of this period. The underside of the sarcophagus shows another frieze, giving the work a momentum of elevation and sublimation.

The weeping female figures in this sarcophagus are the subject of Enis Batur's collection of poetry entitled Le Tombeau des Pleureuses.
