= Lycian sarcophagus of Sidon =

5th-century BC Phoenician royal coffin

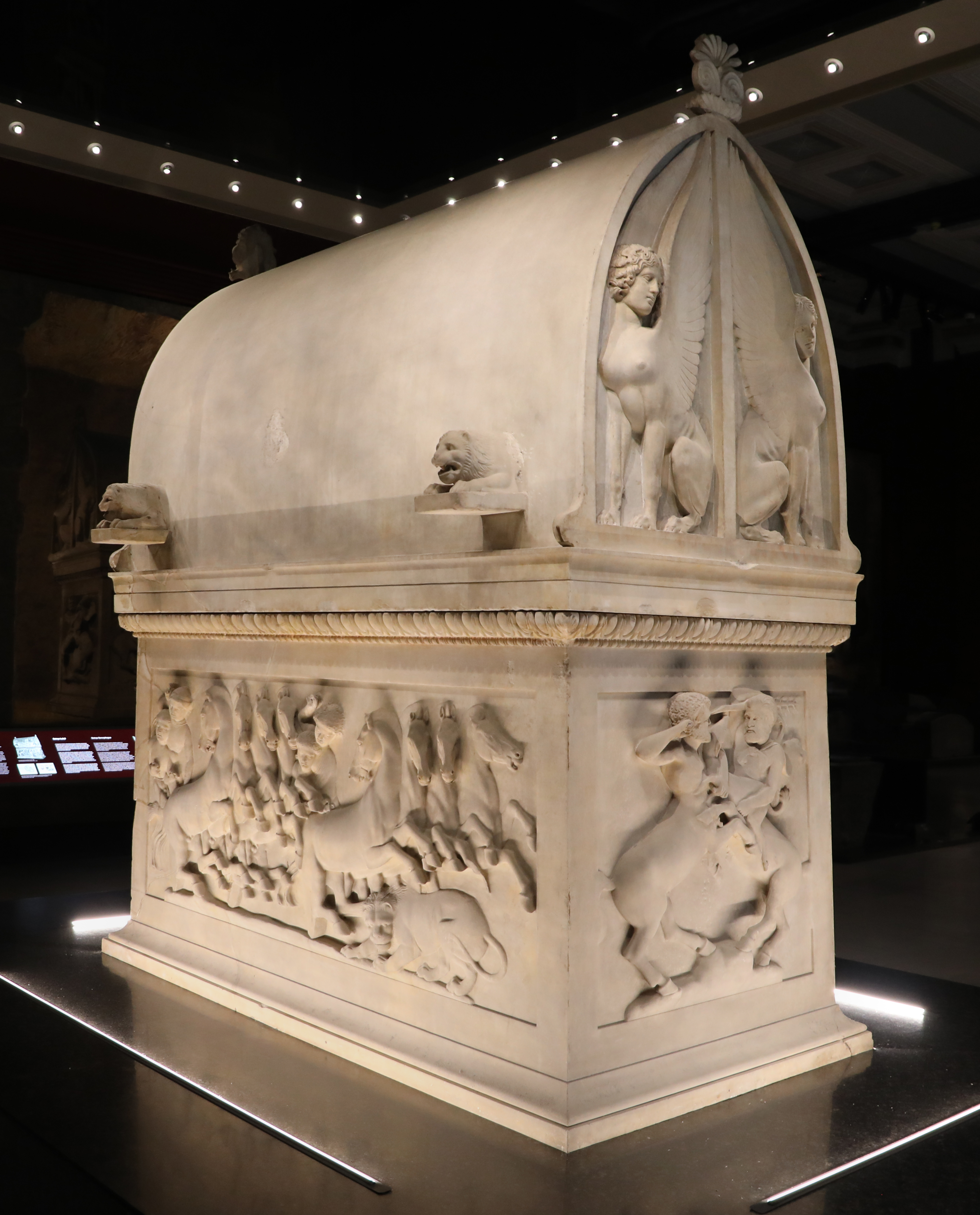
- Lycian sarcophagus in Parian marble from the Sidon necropolis.
- Material: Parian marble
- Created: 430-420 BC
- Discovered: 1887
- Present location: Istanbul Archaeology Museums

The Lycian sarcophagus of Sidon is a sarcophagus discovered in the Royal necropolis of Ayaa near Sidon, Lebanon. It is made of Parian marble, and resembles the shapes of ogival Lycian tombs, such as the Tomb of Payava, hence its name. It is now located in the Istanbul Archaeological Museum, Turkey. It is dated to circa 430–420 BC. This sarcophagus, as well as others in the Sidon necropolis, belonged to a succession of kings who ruled in the area of Phoenicia between the mid-5th century BC to the end of the 4th century BC.

The sarcophagus was decorated in Greek sculptural style by Greek artists from Ionia, but incorporating the general shape of the ogival tombs from Lycia, such as the Tomb of Payava. This is sometimes presented as an example of Greco-Persian art, although this should be qualified more precisely as Greco-Anatolian art, since such examples are unknown in the wider Achaemenid Empire.

The sarcophagus is decorated with reliefs, the side reliefs illustrating a lion-hunt and a boar-hunt, while the reliefs at the end show fighting centaurs and sphinxes.

The Lycian sarcophagus of Sidon, is, together with the famous Alexander Sarcophagus, one of four massive carved sarcophagi, that were discovered during the excavations of the Ayaa Necropolis conducted by Osman Hamdi Bey, an Ottoman art expert and Yervant Voskan, an Ottoman of Armenian descent, at the necropolis near Sidon, Lebanon in 1887.

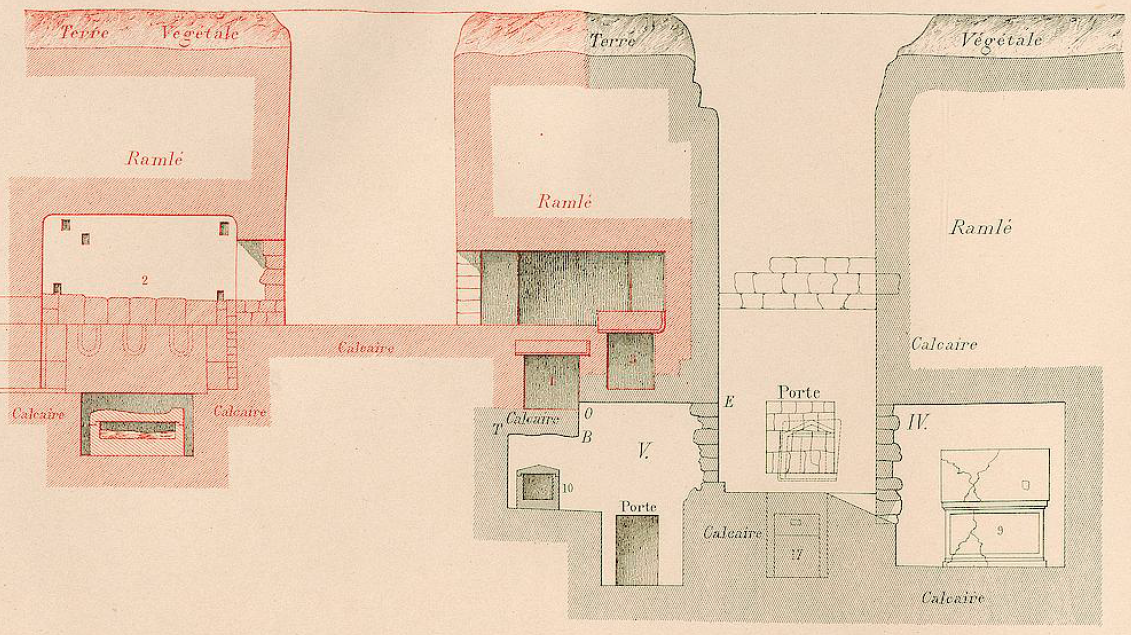
The Lycian sarcophagus was the lowest tomb in the Sidon necropolis.

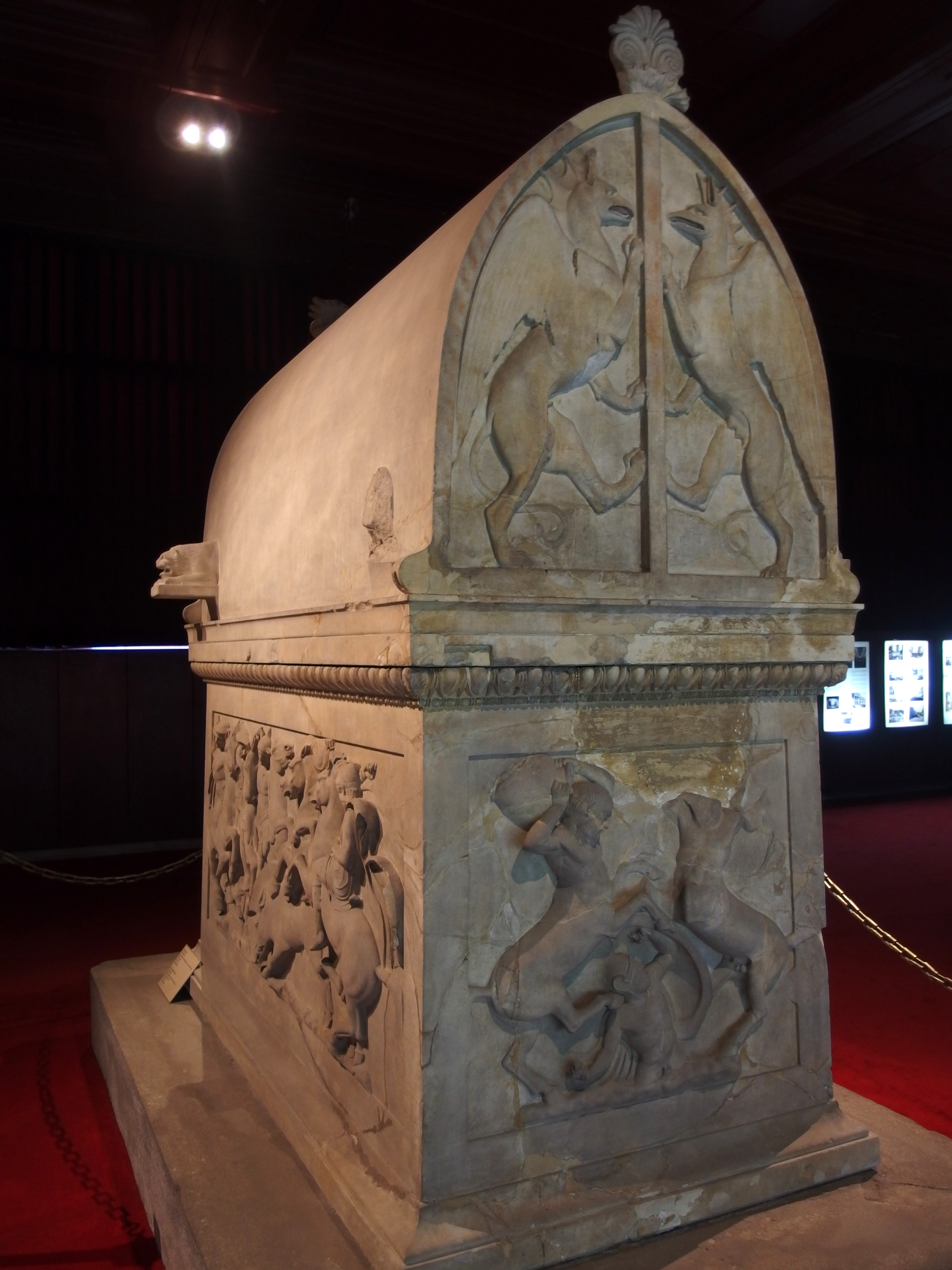

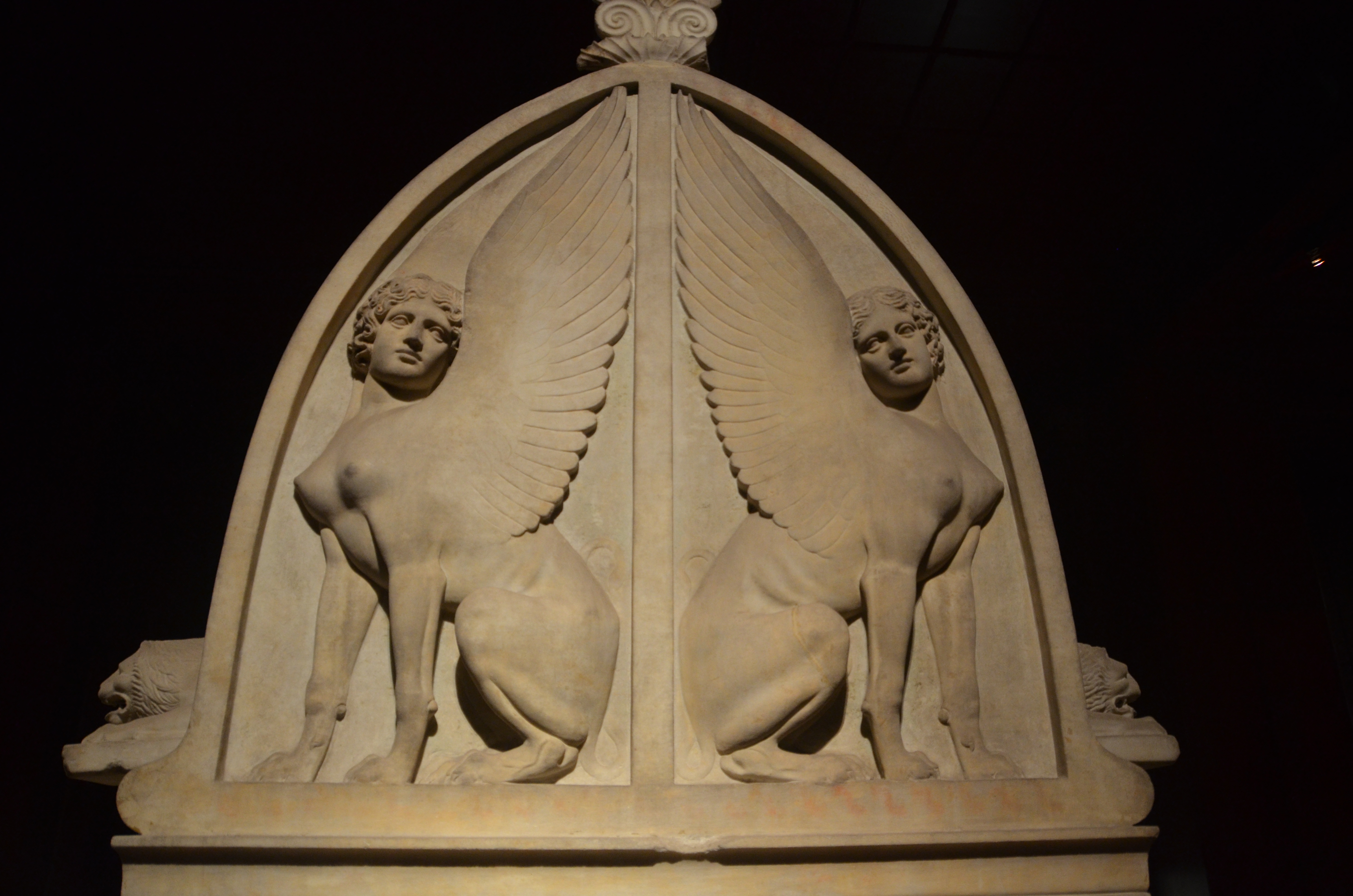

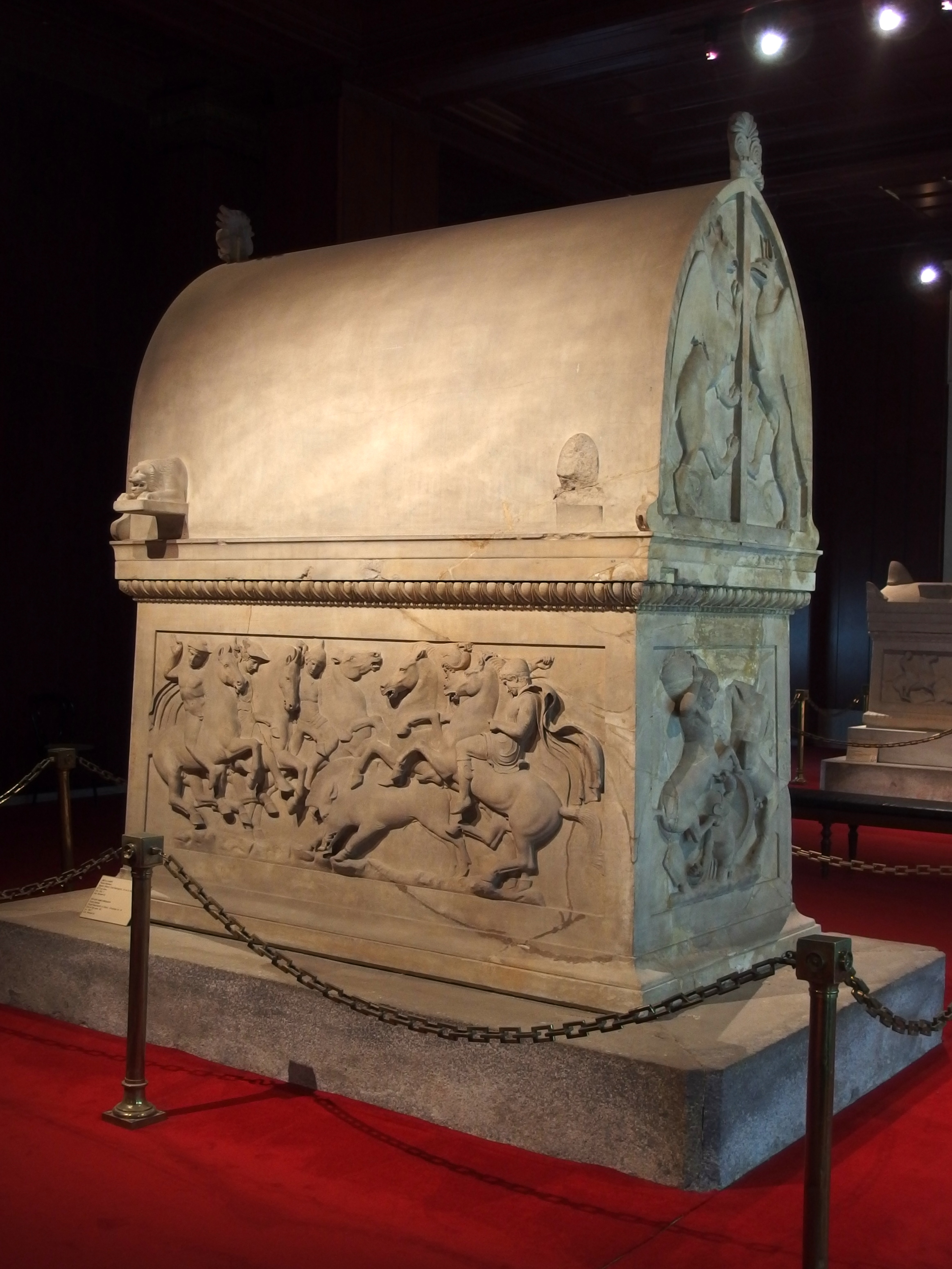

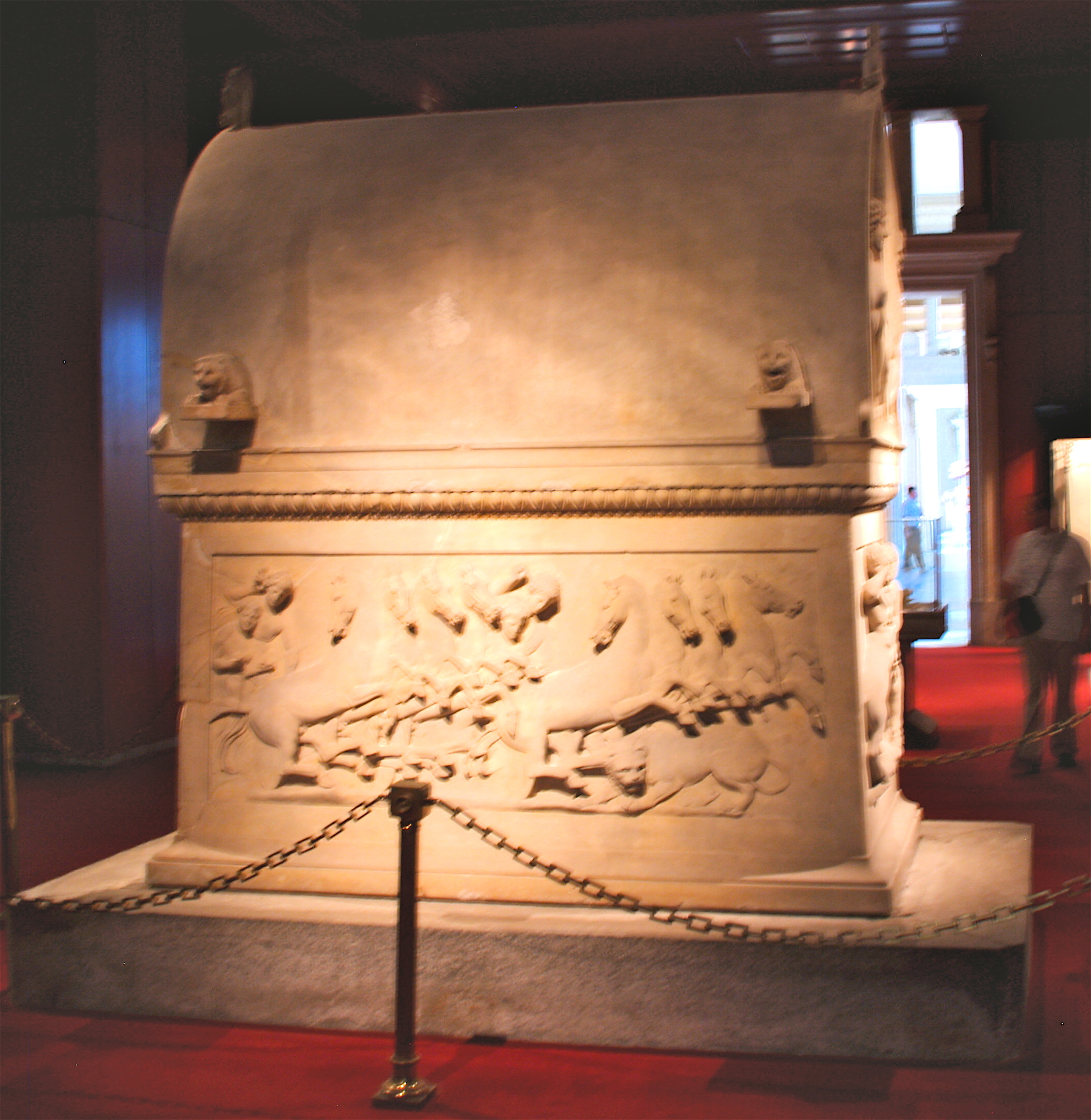

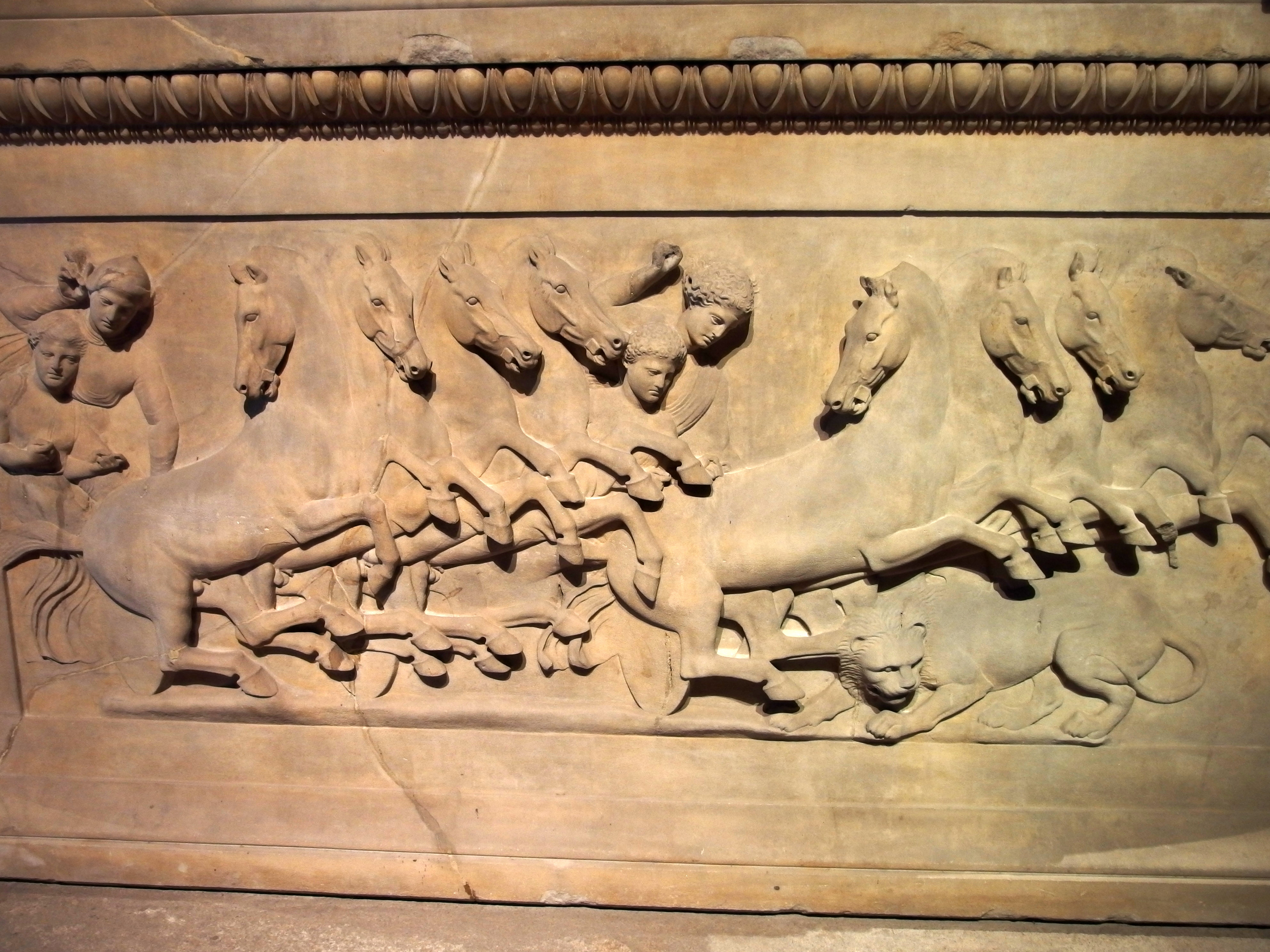

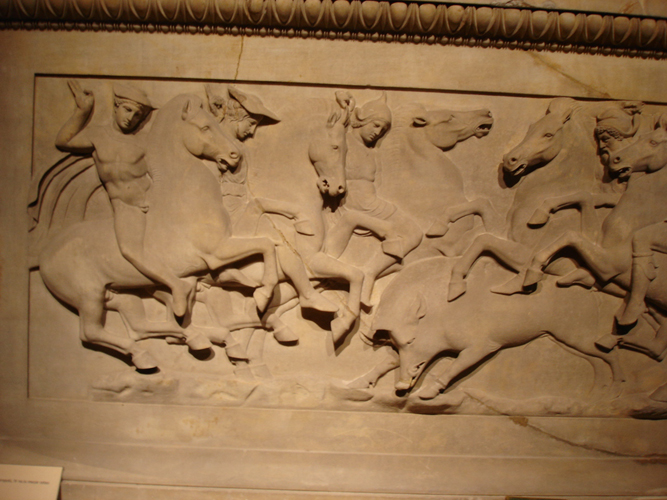

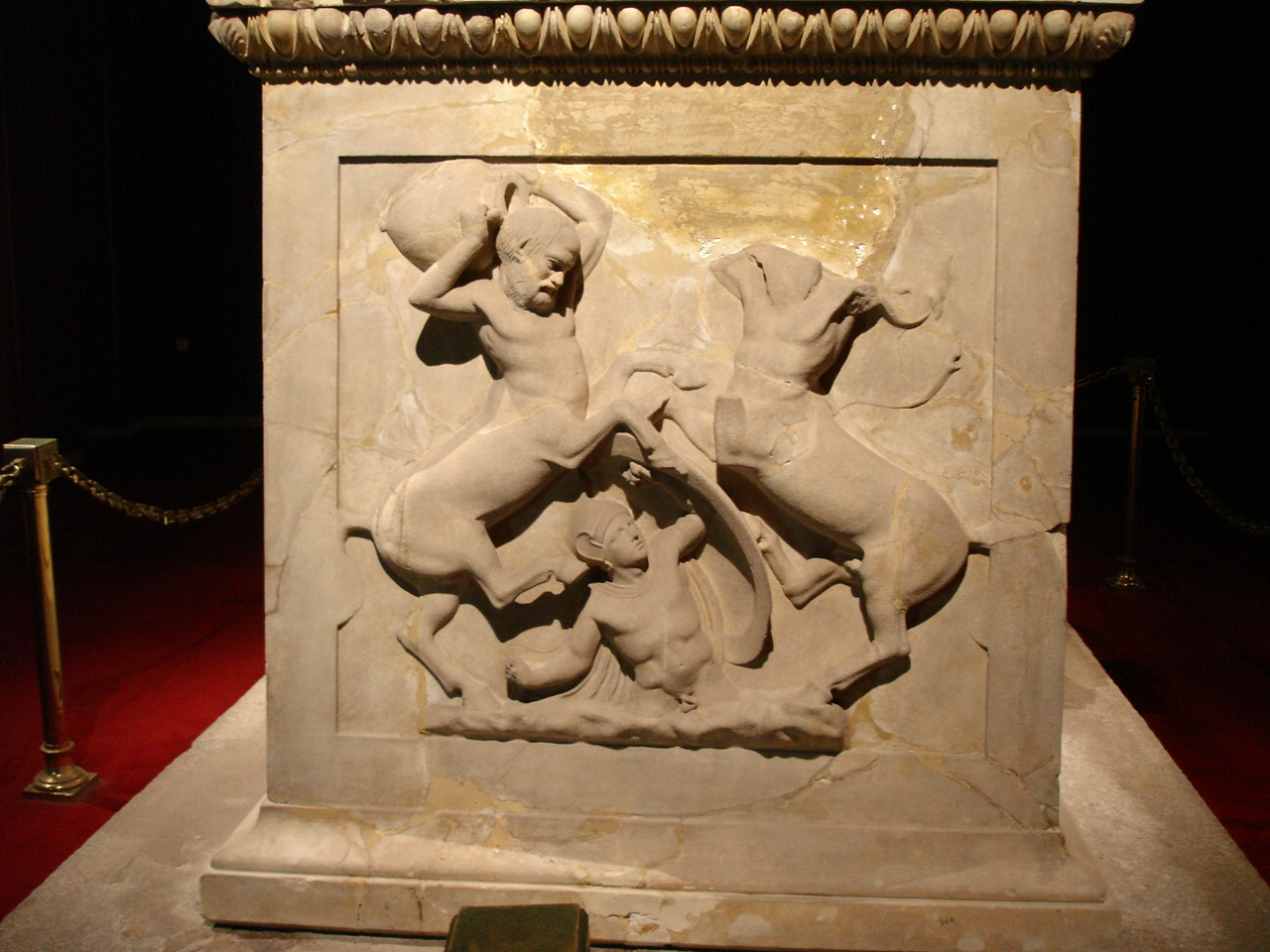

== See also ==
- Tabnit sarcophagus
- Alexander Sarcophagus
