= Hlaliyeh =

Village in South Governorate, Lebanon

Hlaliyeh الهلالية Hilalieh
- Municipality
- Location in Lebanon
- Coordinates: 33°34′07″N 35°23′40″E
- Country: Lebanon
- Governorate: South Governorate
- District: Sidon District

Area
  - Land: 0.35 sq mi (0.91 km^{2})
- Elevation: 460 ft (140 m)
- Time zone: UTC+2 (EET)
  - Summer (DST): UTC+3 (EEST)

Hlaliyeh (Arabic: الهلالية, romanized: al-Helāliyah), also spelled Hilalieh, is a municipality of Sidon in Lebanon. It is located 43 kilometres (27 mi) from Beirut.

== History ==
In 1838, Eli Smith noted el-Helaliyeh, as a village located in "Aklim et-Tuffah, adjacent to Seida".

In 1875 Victor Guérin traveled in the region, and noted about Helalieh: "This village has 200 inhabitants, either Maronites or United Greeks. The church was built, as well as several houses, with regular stones of ancient appearance."

== Demographics ==
In 2014, Christians made up 90.61% and Muslims made up 8.30% of registered voters in Hlaliyeh. 50.90% of the voters were Greek Catholics and 30.32% were Maronite Catholics.

== Bibliography ==
- Guérin, V. (1880). Description Géographique Historique et Archéologique de la Palestine (in French). Vol. 3: Galilee, pt. 2. Paris: L'Imprimerie Nationale.
- Robinson, E.; Smith, E. (1841). Biblical Researches in Palestine, Mount Sinai and Arabia Petraea: A Journal of Travels in the year 1838. Vol. 2. Boston: Crocker & Brewster.
