= Helena of Egypt =

Ancient Greek painter

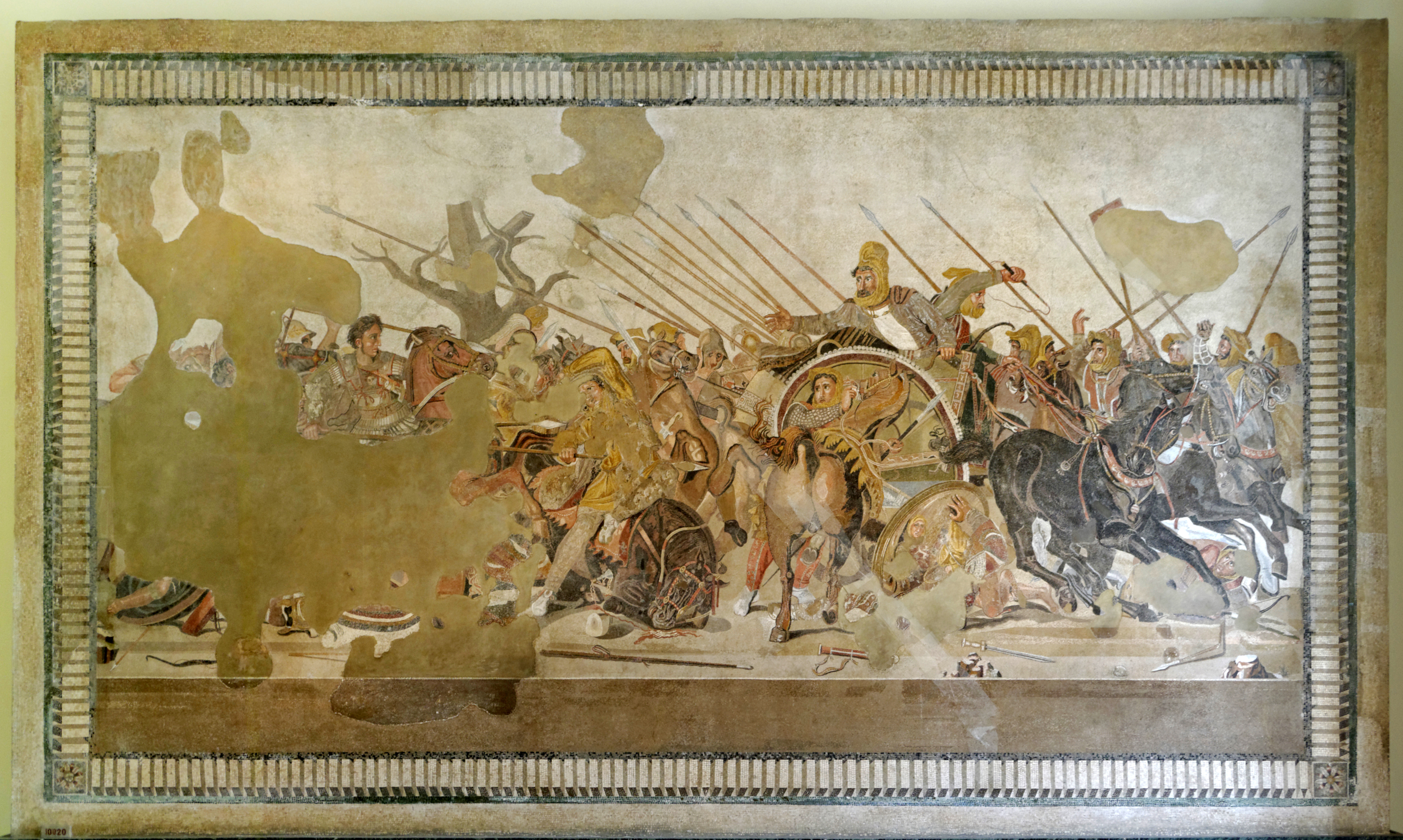
- Battle of Issus Mosaic, Museo Archeologico Nazionale, Naples. A later Roman copy possibly inspired by Helena's earlier mosaic of the same battle scene.
- Born: Egypt
- Occupation: painter

Helena (active during the 4th century BC in Egypt) was a painter who learned her craft from her father, Timon, who was also an artist. She worked in the period after the death of Alexander the Great in 323 BC. Helena painted a scene of Alexander defeating the Persian ruler, Darius III, at the Battle of Issus in Southern Asia Minor.

Pliny the Elder writes that “The Battle of Issus” was Helena’s only recorded work, of which there is a mosaic reproduction. Indeed, a mosaic reproduction was found in Pompeii. This reproduction was found as a floor mosaic in Pompeii at the House of the Faun during nineteenth century excavations, and is now located in the Museo Archeologico Nazionale in Naples. Although the identity of this extant mosaic's artist is unknown it is thought to be a copy of an earlier work by Philoxenos of Eretria, but very well could be a copy in fact of Helena's. The only other information on Helena of Egypt exists in the encyclopedic work Bibliotheka by Photios I, a patriarch of Constantinople. Her name, along with Helen of Troy, appears in a list of women named Helena, with her passage reading:

"And Helen the female painter also belongs to the list. She was the daughter of Timon the Egyptian. She painted the Battle of Issus at the time when she was at the height of her powers. The picture was displayed in the Temple of Peace under Vespasian."

According to other translations, she "painted the Battle of Issus about the time of its occurrence," which dates her to 4th century BC and supports the argument that she was a contemporary of Alexander the Great. The attribution is disputed because of Helena's gender; no other mosaic work known to be by a woman has ever been uncovered from this period in history.
