= House of the Faun =

Upper-Class Private Residence in Pompeii with preserved artworks

Coordinates: 40°45′4.5″N 14°29′4.5″E

- Casa del Fauno
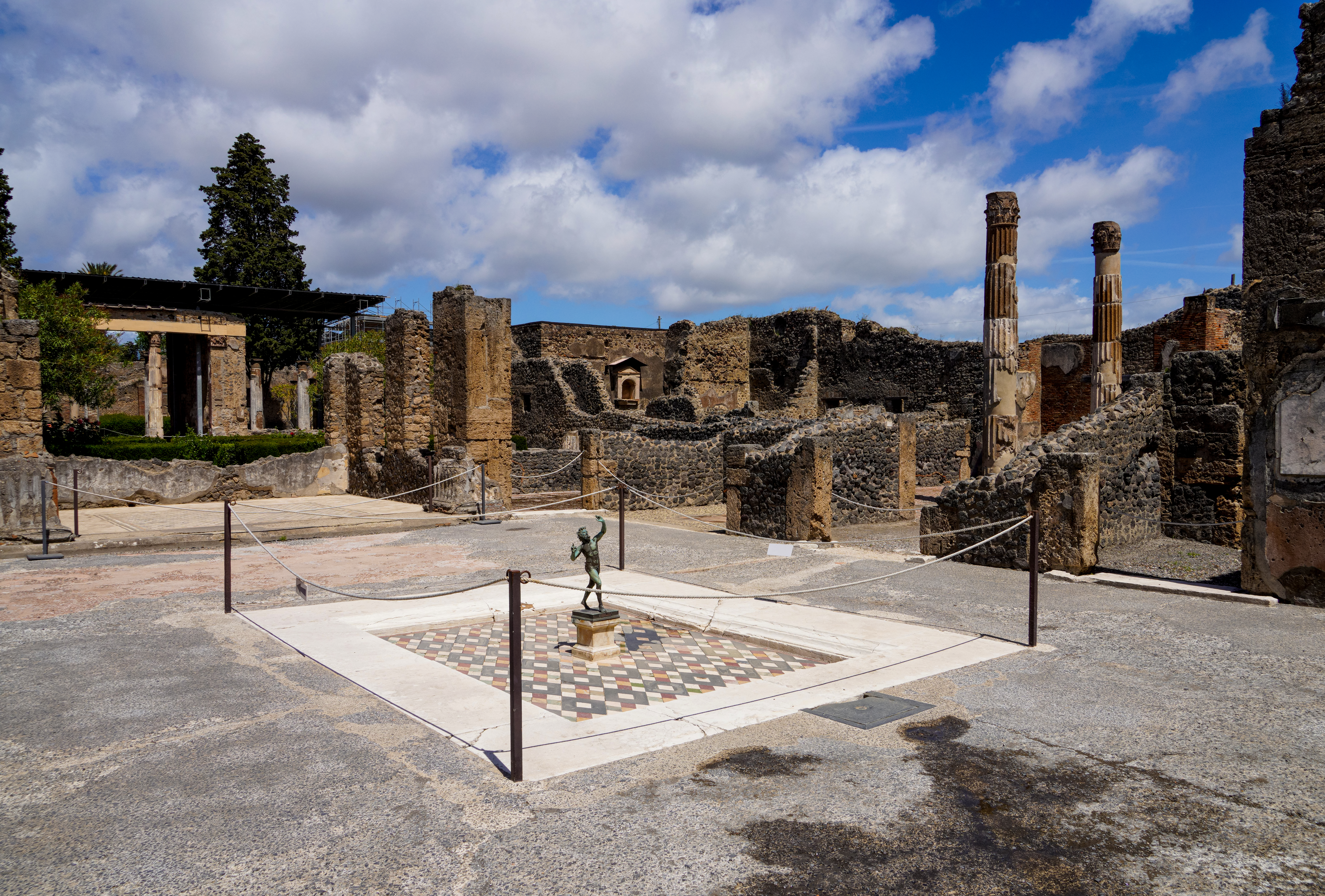
- Front view of the house
- Interactive map of the House of the Faun area

General information
- Location: Pompeii, Roman Empire, Italy
- Construction started: 180 BCE

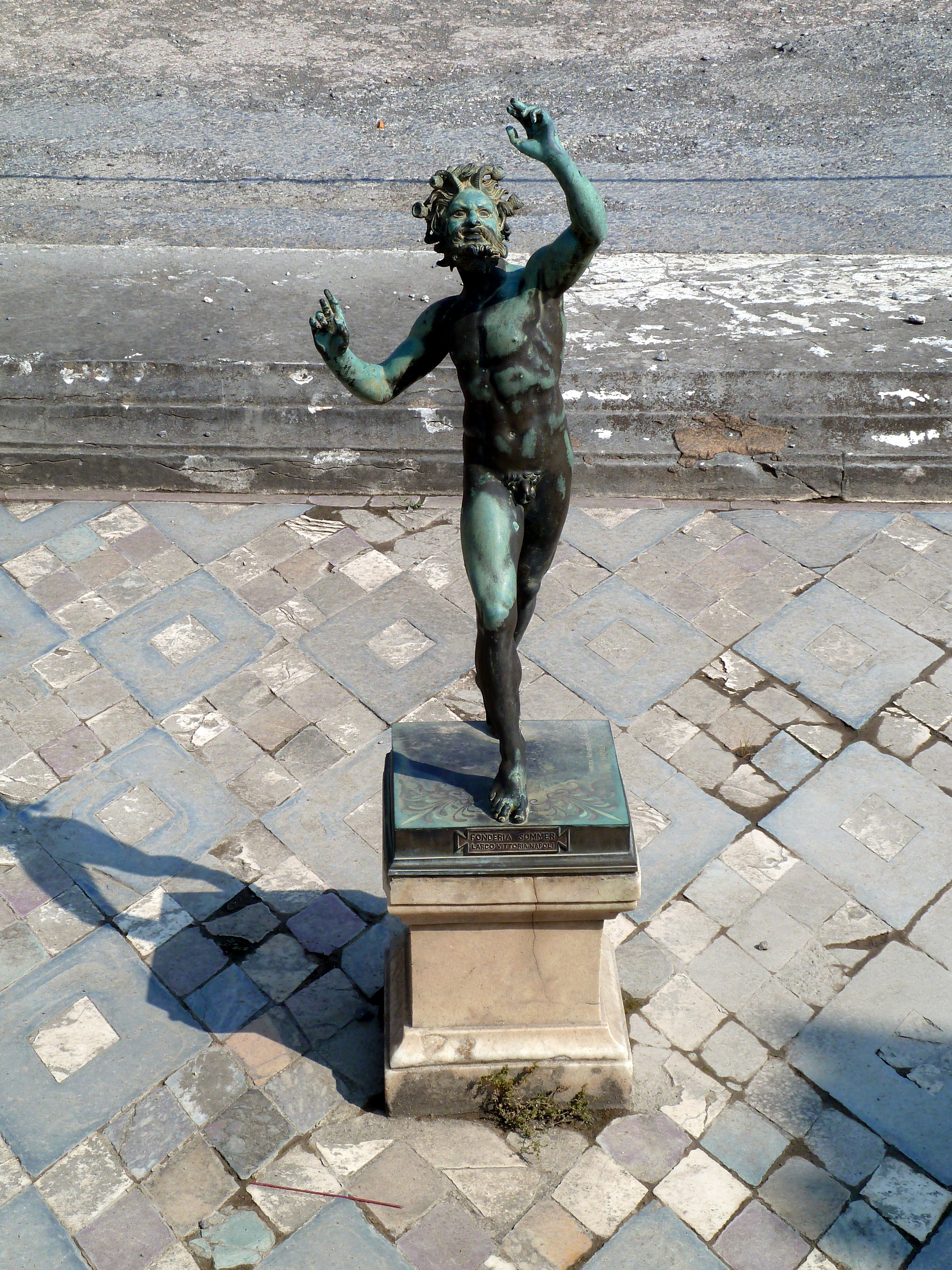
Copy of the Dancing Faun

The House of the Faun (Italian: Casa del Fauno), constructed in the 2nd century BCE during the Samnite period (180 BCE), was a grand Hellenistic residence that was framed by peristyle in Pompeii, Italy. The historical significance in this impressive estate is found in the many great pieces of art that were well preserved from the ash of the eruption of Mount Vesuvius in 79 CE. It is one of the most luxurious aristocratic houses from the Roman Republic, and reflects this period better than most archaeological evidence found even in Rome itself.

== Houses of the higher class ==
The House of the Faun, along with the House of Pansa and the House of the Silver Wedding represent the higher class of the Roman houses of the Republic. More than 190 years after its excavation, the craftsmanship and quality of materials have been found to be exceptional, even amongst the other noble houses in Pompeii. There is evidence, most notably in the eastern walls of the tetrastyle atrium, that after the AD 62 Pompeii earthquake, the House of the Faun was rebuilt and repaired, as revealed by excavation beneath the floor of the house; yet, the building was only used again until CE 79, when it was ultimately rendered unusable by the eruption of Mount Vesuvius. Although the eruption was devastating, the layers of ash covering the city preserved artworks, like the mosaics, which would have otherwise been likely destroyed or severely decayed due to the passage of time.

== Faun statue ==
The bronze statue of a dancing faun (actually a satyr, since the lower body is that of a man) is what the House of the Faun is named after. In the centre of the atrium there is a white limestone impluvium, a basin for collecting water. The statue was found on October 26 of 1830 near one side of the impluvium and a small fountain in the center. The original statue is currently located in the National Archaeological Museum (Museo Archeologico Nazionale) in Naples, thus the statue seen today in the house’s ruins is a copy. Fauns are spirits of untamed woodland; they are typically depicted as half human and half goat. Literate and Hellenized Romans often connected their depictions of fauns with Pan and Greek satyrs, who were the wild followers of the Greek god of wine and drama, Dionysus. It is purely a decorative sculpture of high order: "the pose is light and graceful," Sir Kenneth Clark observed.

== Inscriptions and their familial associations ==
Archaeologists discovered an inscription bearing the cognomen Saturninus, suggesting that the dwelling was owned by the important gens, or clan, Satria; a ring bearing the family name Cassius was also found, indicating that someone of the Cassii family married into the gens Satria and lived in the House of the Faun.

== Excavations ==
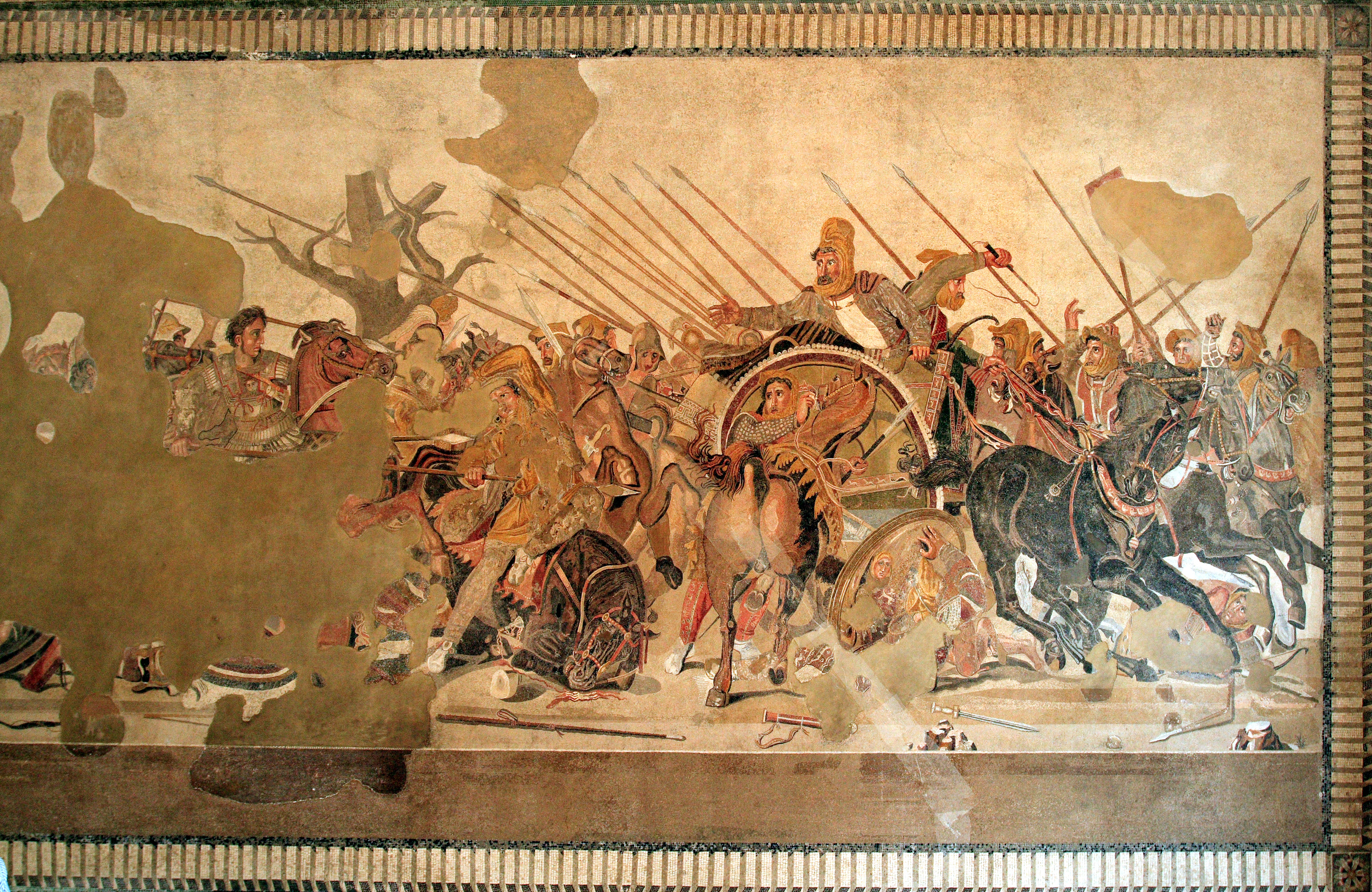
The Alexander Mosaic, showing Alexander at left. A copy is displayed in the House of the Faun, where the original was found.

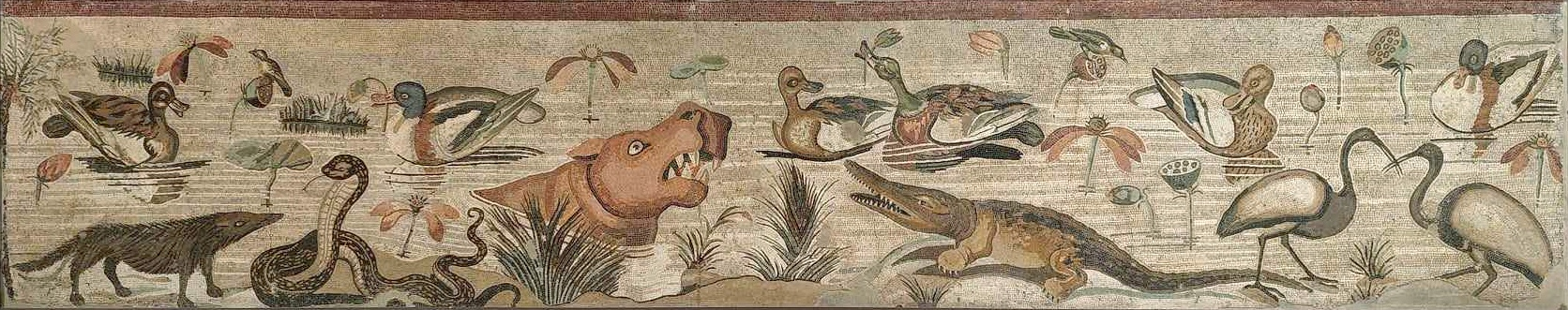
The Nilotic scene mosaic depicts exotic animals in the Nile.

The House of the Faun was initially excavated in 1830 by the German archaeological institute.

Five bodies were found in the house including one woman and three boys.

The most notable of the artworks found in the House of the Faun is the Alexander Mosaic; a reconstructed version of the mosaic can be seen today; the original was removed from the floor where it was found and placed in the National Archaeological Museum in Naples. In the 1830s when it was first discovered, the mosaic was thought to represent a battle scene depicted in the Iliad, but architectural historians have found the mosaic actually depicts the Battle of Issus in 333 BCE between Alexander the Great and Darius III of Persia, which took place about 150 years before the House of the Faun was constructed. This mosaic may be inspired by or copied from a Greek painting finished in the late fourth century BCE, probably by the artist Philoxenus of Eretria. Unlike most Pompeian pavements of the late second and early first centuries, this mosaic is made of tesserae, and not the more common opus signinum, or other kinds of stone chips set in mortar.

The Alexander Mosaic is complemented by other floor mosaics with Nilotic scenes and theatrical masks. Other notable works of art from the House of Faun include an erotic Satyr and Nymph and the fish mosaic, a piece closely resembling other mosaics in Pompeii.

Building plan

== Architectural design ==
The House of the Faun was the largest and most expensive residence found in Pompeii, and today it is one of the most visited of the ruins. The house occupies an entire city block or insula, and the interior covers about 3,000 square meters, which is nearly 32,300 square feet. The house is based upon two magnificent colonnaded gardens or peristyles, one Ionic and the other Doric. It also has two atriums, the Tuscan and the peristyle atrium. The focus of the decoration of the house, the Alexander mosaic, is placed on the central visual axis between the first and second peristyles, in a room referred to as an exedra. Mosaics on the floors of the peristyles evoke the flora and fauna of the Nile. The wall frescoes above these pavements are the largest surviving example of the false marble panelling characteristic of the First Pompeian Style.

Several historians (such as M. Bergmann, F. Guidobaldi, J.J. Thomas, A.-M. Guimier-Sorbets) have pointed out that the decorational scheme of the house's second phase shows clear links to Egypt and specifically to Ptolemaic Alexandria. The mosaics include typically Alexandrian/Egyptian iconography and motifs or appear to follow Alexandrian types. They also make liberal use of faience, which was somewhat rare outside of Egypt at the time. Some of the paint work in the house mimics types of Egyptian stone that were not yet known on the Italian peninsula and the illusionistic stucco facade in the house's vestibule echoes Alexandrian architecture. Bergmann has suggested that even the bronze satyr which gave the house its name may have been created in Alexandria or by Alexandrian artists. Both Guidobaldi and Guimier-Sorbets conclude that Alexandrian workshops were responsible for at least parts of the decorational scheme of the second phase (such as the mosaic, opus sectile and paint work).

Like many ancient Roman houses, the House of the Faun had tabernae, or storefront shops, and a highly sophisticated building plan, which details the many rooms. The entryway of the House of the Faun is decorated by red and white stone that read out the Latin message “HAVE”, which can be translated to “Hail to you!”. The fact that this mosaic is not in the local languages, Oscan and Samnian, has caused debate between historians on whether it was put into place before the Roman colonization of Pompeii in 80 BCE or if the owners had "pretensions of Latin glory."

Like other wealthy aristocrats of the Roman Republic, the owners of the House of the Faun installed a private bath system, or balneum, in the house. The baths were located in the domestic wing to the right of the entrance, and it along with the kitchen was heated by a large furnace. The servants’ quarters were dark and cramped, and there was not much furniture. The house features beautiful peristyle gardens, the second of which was created as a stage to host recitations, mimes, and pantomimes. Additionally, the house contained an entrance passage, a number of bedrooms (cubicula), dining rooms (triclinia) for both the summer and winter, a reception room (oecus), and an office (tablinum).

== Tourist attraction ==
In the present day, visitors can still explore the remains of the House of the Faun in modern Pompeii, along Via di Nola. Although most of the original artworks have been relocated to the National Archaeological Museum, Naples, the most famous pieces, like the Dancing Faun and the Alexander Mosaic, have been recreated to give tourists a clearer picture of what the house was originally like. Pietro Giovanni Guzzo, one of Pompeii's past archaeological superintendents, explained, "I want visitors to have the impression that they are entering the same luxurious house in which the ancient Pompeian owners lived before it was destroyed by the eruption of Mount Vesuvius in AD 79."

== Gallery ==
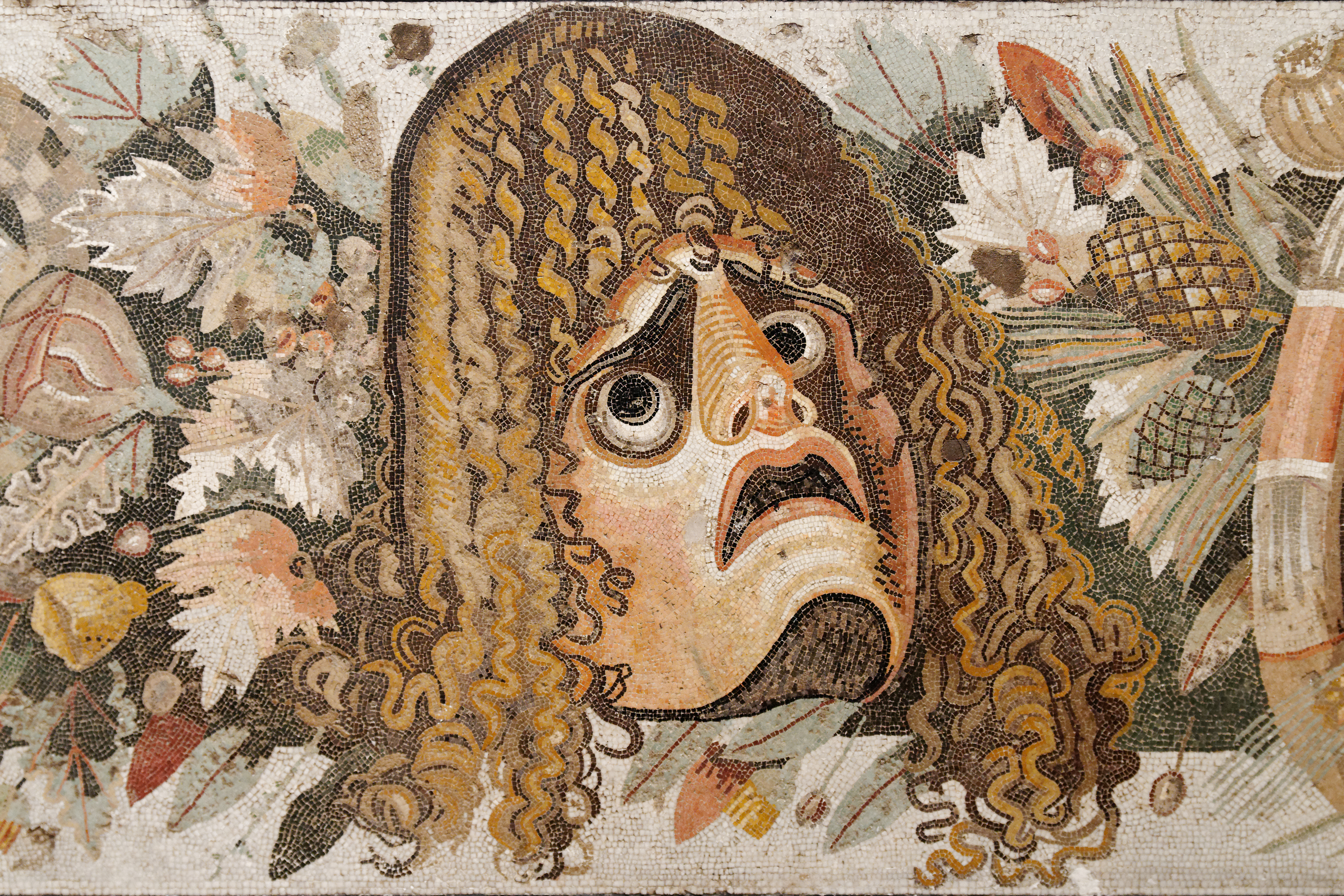
Fruit and masks mosaic (detail)

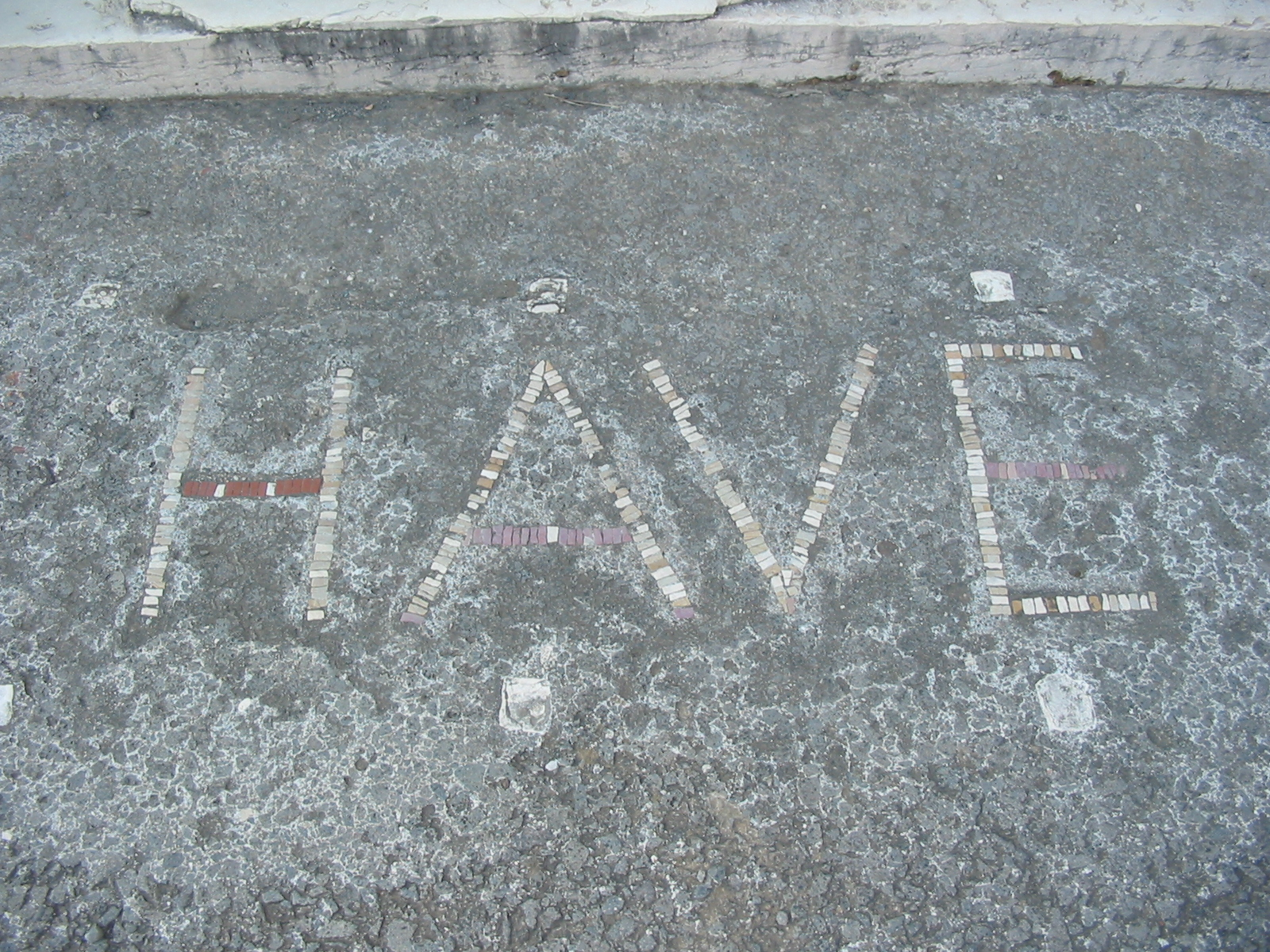
The "HAVE" Mosaic (spelling variant of Ave)

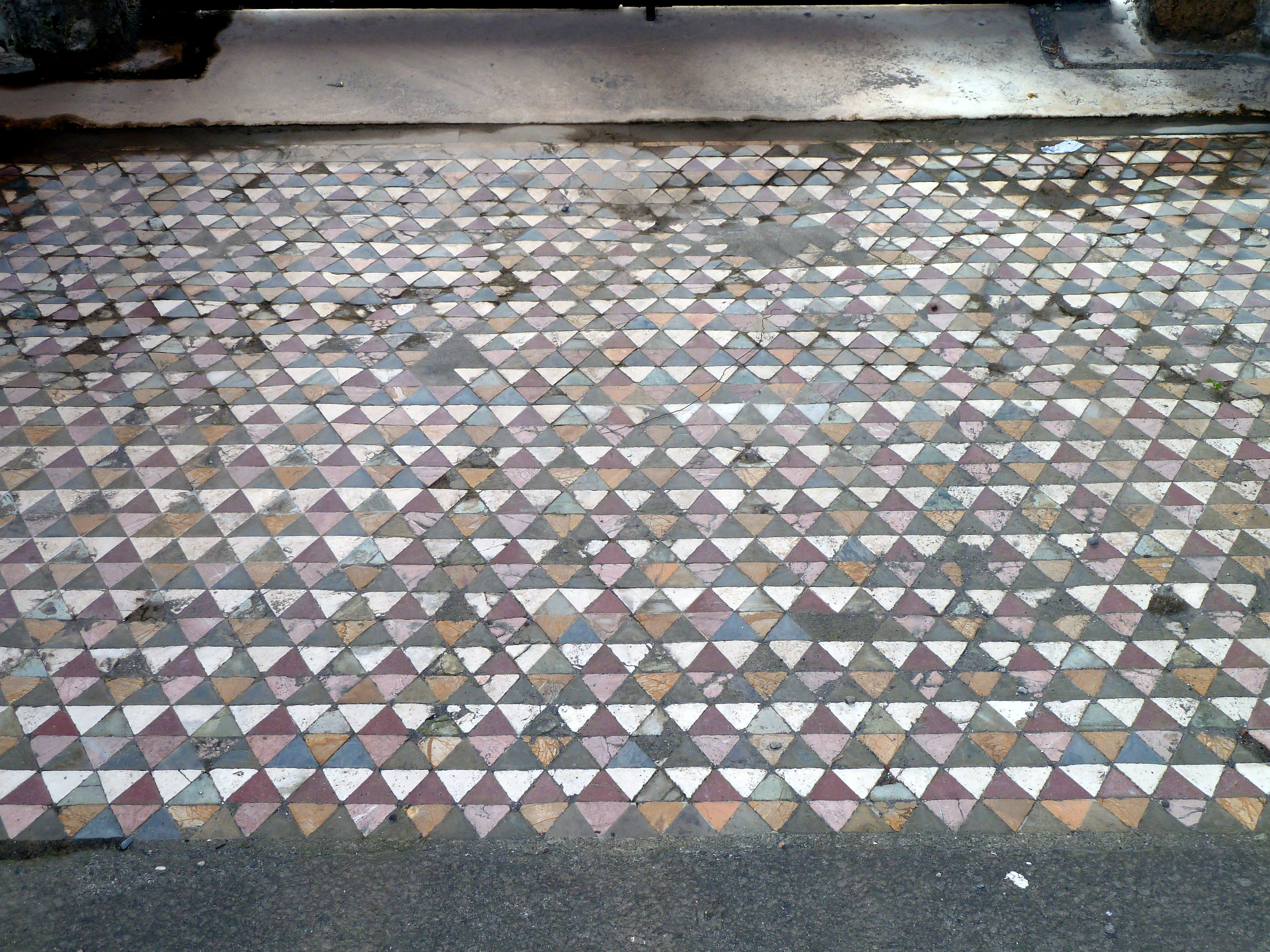
Opus sectile in vestibulum

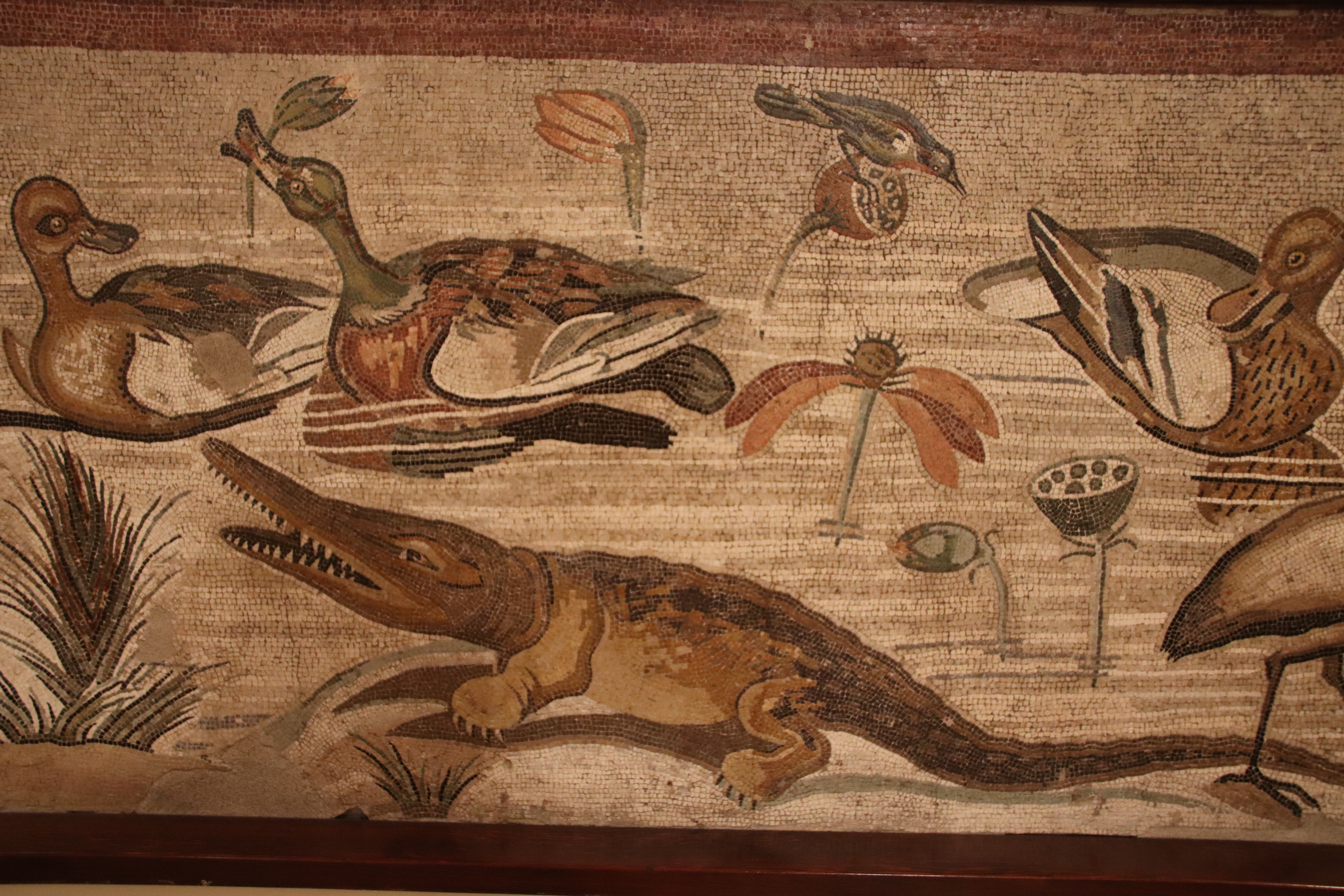
Nile River mosaic landscape

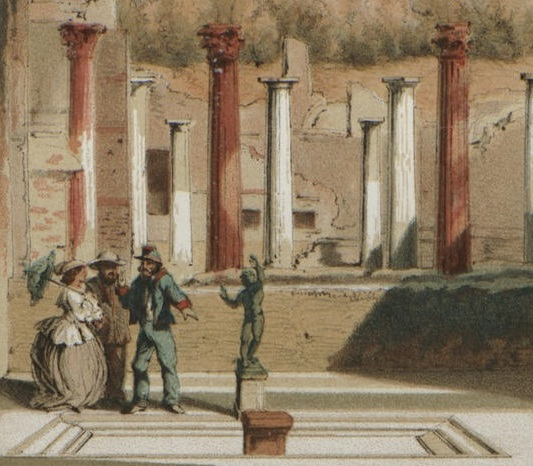
Detail of an illustration from 1854. Impluvium with a small fountain in the center and copy of the Faun on the edge.

== Bibliography ==
- Butterworth, Alex; Laurence, Ray (2005). Pompeii: The Living City. New York: St. Martin's Press.
- Hornblower, Simon; Spawforth, Antony (1996). The Oxford Classical Dictionary (3rd ed.). Oxford: Oxford University Press.
- Little, A. M. G. (1935). "The Decoration of The Hellenistic Peristyle House in South Italy". American Journal of Archaeology. 39 (3): 360–371. doi:10.2307/498623. JSTOR 498623.
