= Oecus =

Principal hall or salon in an Ancient Roman house

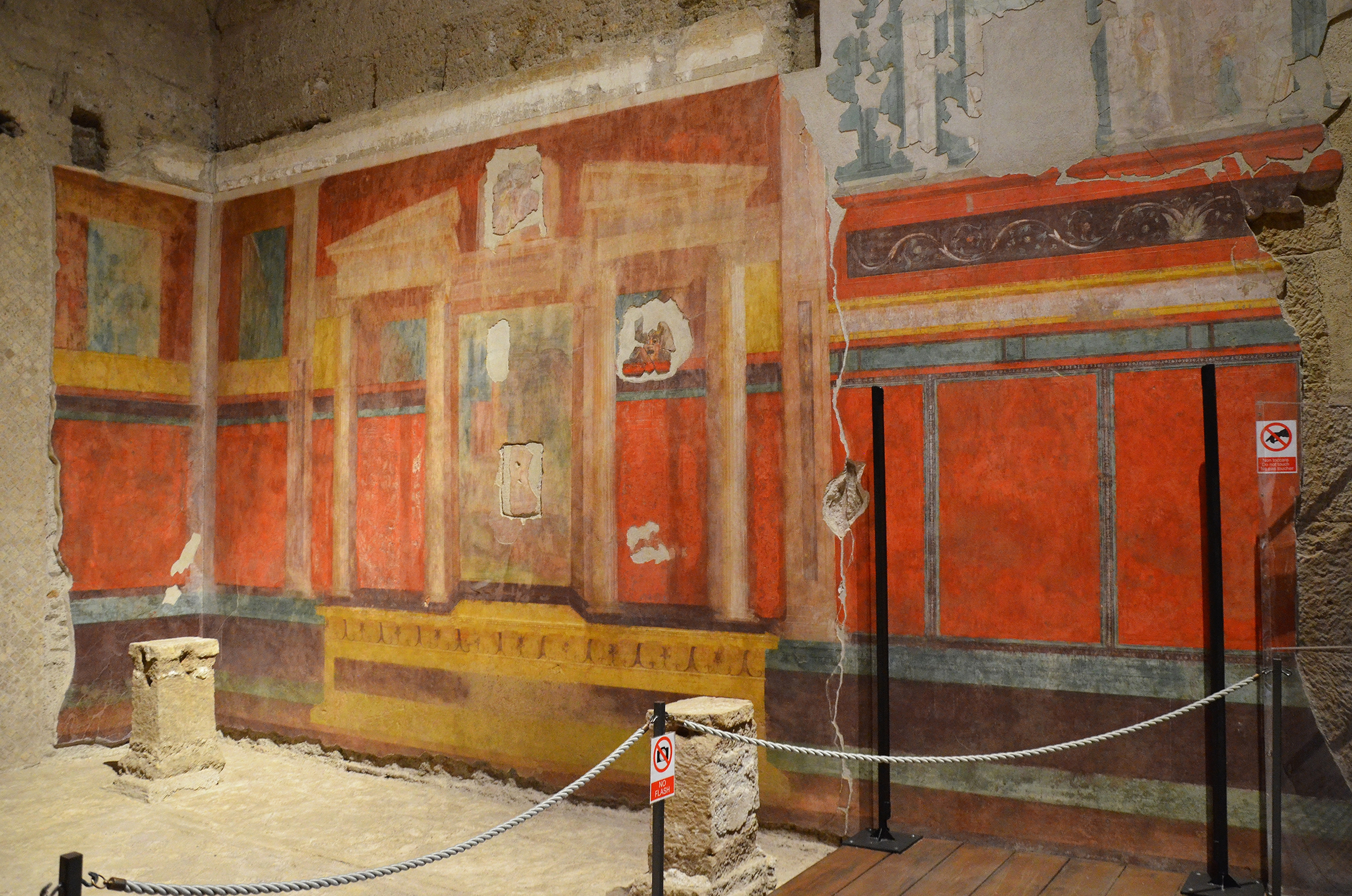
House of Augustus, south wall of the "Large oecus" with frescoes in the Pompeian Style, Palatine Hill, Rome

Oecus is the Latinized form of Greek oikos, used by Vitruvius for the principal hall or salon in a Roman house, which was used occasionally as a triclinium for banquets.

When of great size it became necessary to support its ceiling with columns; thus, according to Vitruvius, the tetrastyle oecus had four columns; in the Corinthian oecus there was a row of columns on each side, virtually therefore dividing the room into nave and aisles, the former being covered over with a barrel vault. The Egyptian oecus had a similar plan, but the aisles were of less height, so that clerestory windows were introduced to light the room, which, as Vitruvius states, presents more the appearance of a basilica than of a triclinium.

Vitruvius distinguishes four types of oecus:

1. Tetrastylos: with four columns;
2. Corinthian: with a row of columns supporting an architrave topped with a cornice and a vaulted ceiling;
3. Egyptian: particularly magnificent form of the oecus, with columns running all around, which support a gallery also provided with columns;
4. Cycicene (κυζίκηνοι from Cyzicus, an ancient city in Mysia): a very spacious, north-facing garden oecus common among the Greeks.

== See also ==
- House of the Faun
- House of the Vettii
