= Abdalonymus =

4th-century BC King of Sidon

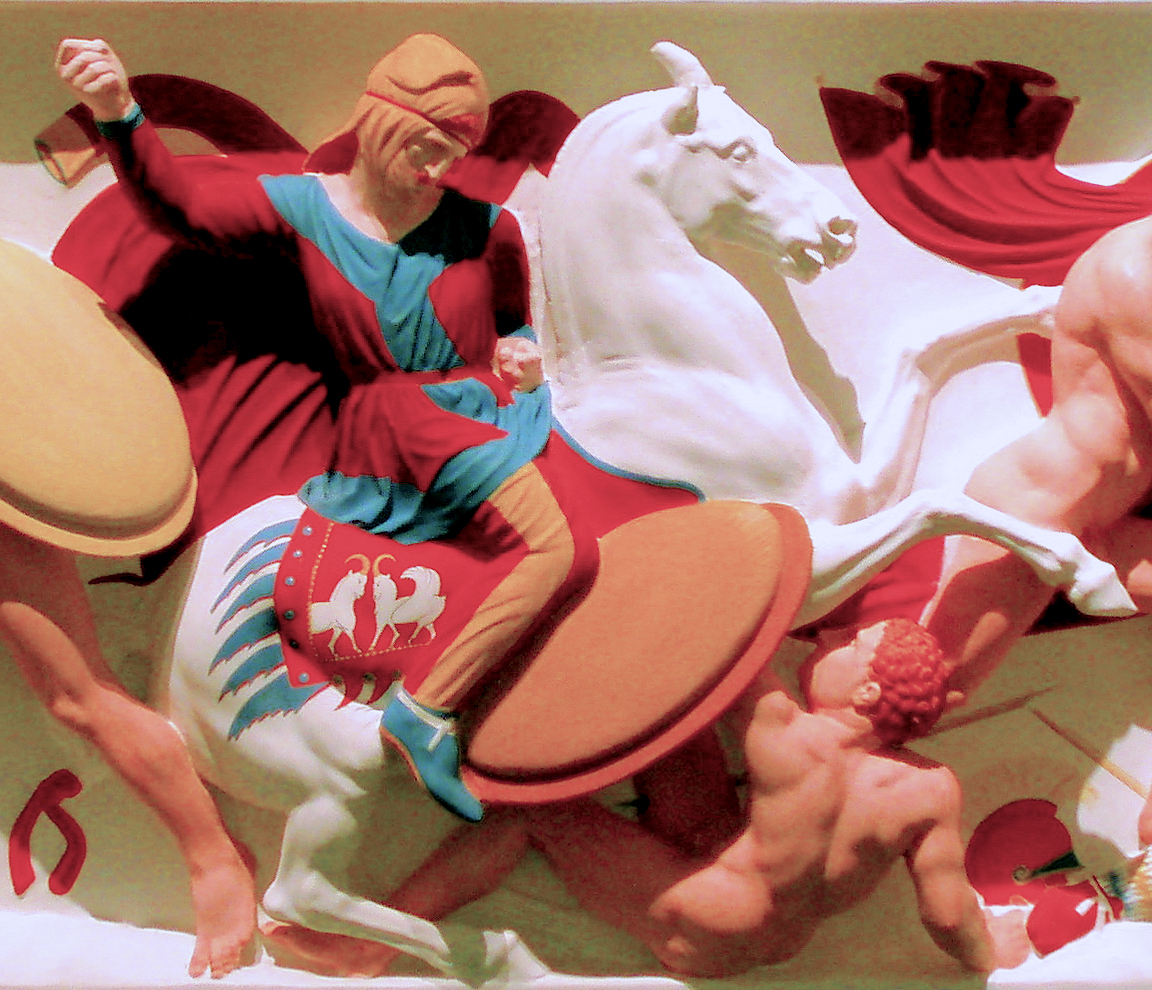
- Purported depiction of Abdalonymous on the Alexander Sarcophagus.

King of Sidon
- Reign: c. 332 BC – c. 329 BC
- Predecessor: Abdashtart II
- Successor: ?
- Phoenician language: 𐤏𐤁𐤃𐤀𐤋𐤍𐤉𐤌
- Religion: Canaanite polytheism

Abdalonymus (Greek: Ἀβδαλώνυμος; Phoenician: 𐤏𐤁𐤃𐤀𐤋𐤍𐤌, romanized: ʿAbd-ʾĪlōnīm, lit. 'Servant of the highest gods') was a Phoenician botanist and gardener of royal descent, who became King of Sidon under Alexander the Great in 332 BC.

== Life ==
After Alexander the Great had subdued Sidon, he gave permission to Hephaestion to bestow its crown on whom he pleased. Hephaestion offered it to two brothers with whom he lodged, but they declined it, alleging that according to their laws it could only be worn by one of royal blood. Instead, they named Abdalonymus, who, notwithstanding his birth, had fallen into such poverty that he supported himself by the cultivation of a kitchen garden.

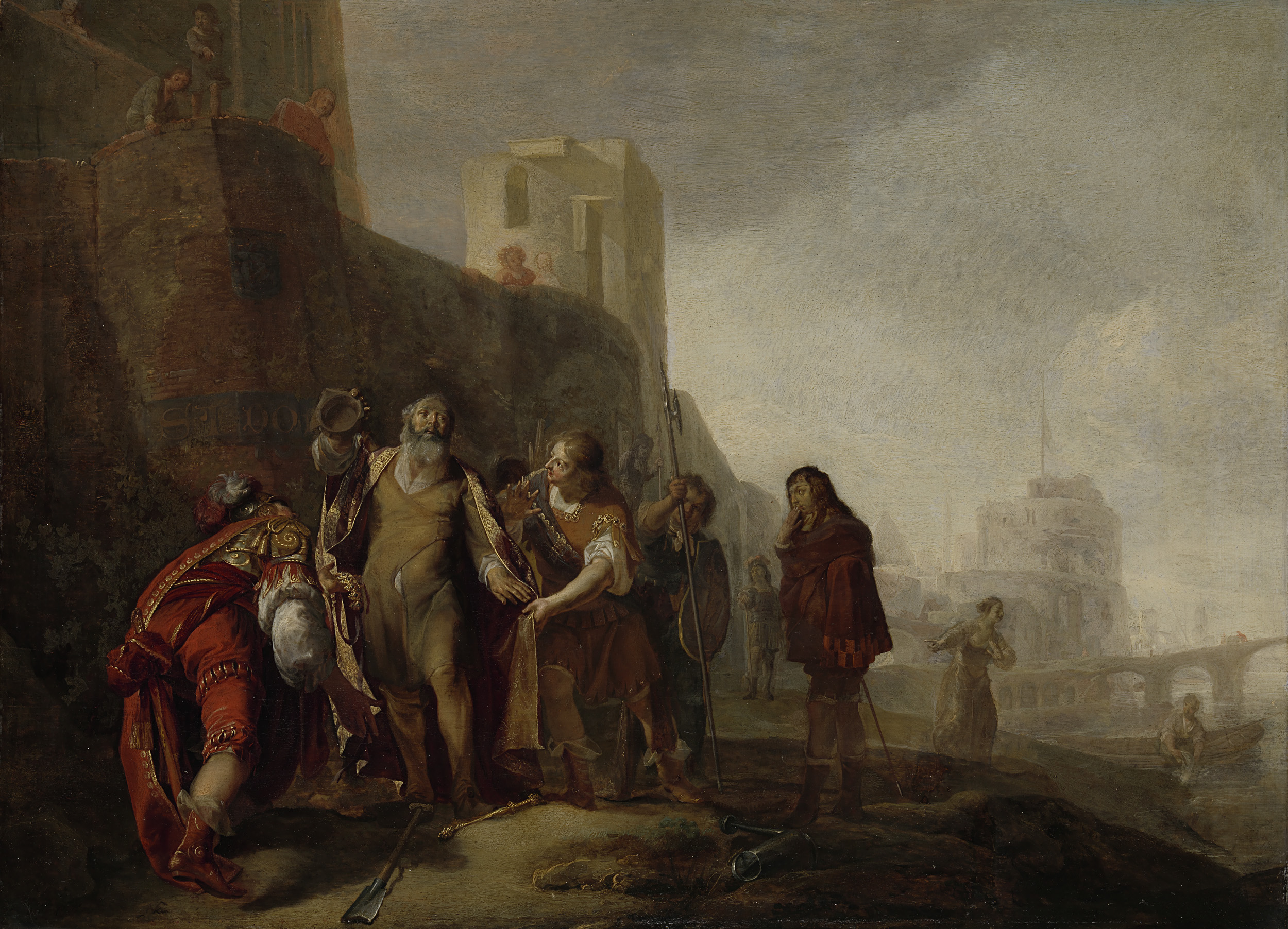
The envoys of Alexander the Great clothe the gardener Abdalonymos with the insignia of the royal dignity of Sidon

Hephaestion directed the brothers to carry the royal crown and robes to Abdalonymus. They obeyed and found him weeding in his garden. After causing him to wash, they invested him with the ensigns of royalty and conducted him to Alexander. This prince, who discerned in him an aspect not unworthy of his origin, turning to those around him, said "I wish to know how he bore his poverty."—"Would to heaven," replied Abdalonymus, "I may as well bear my prosperity! These hands have ministered to all my necessities, and as I possessed nothing, I wanted nothing." Alexander was so well pleased with this reply, that he confirmed the nomination of Hephaestion, and gave the new king the palace and private estate of Strato his predecessor, and even augmented his dominions from the neighboring country.

The so-called "Alexander Sarcophagus", discovered near Sidon and now in the Istanbul Archaeological Museum, is now generally thought to be that of Abdalonymus, depicting him hunting alongside the eponymous general, though some scholars now believe the sarcophagus was that of Mazaeus, a Persian noble and governor of Babylon.

While Quintus Curtius confirms this story, as does Justin, Diodorus calls this person Ballonimus, and says he was made king of Tyre, not Sidon. Plutarch removes the scene to Paphos, and names him Alonymus. Curtius likely adorned the story with fictitious circumstances.

== See also ==
- List of Kings of Tyre
