= Alexander Mosaic =

Roman mosaic of Pompeii

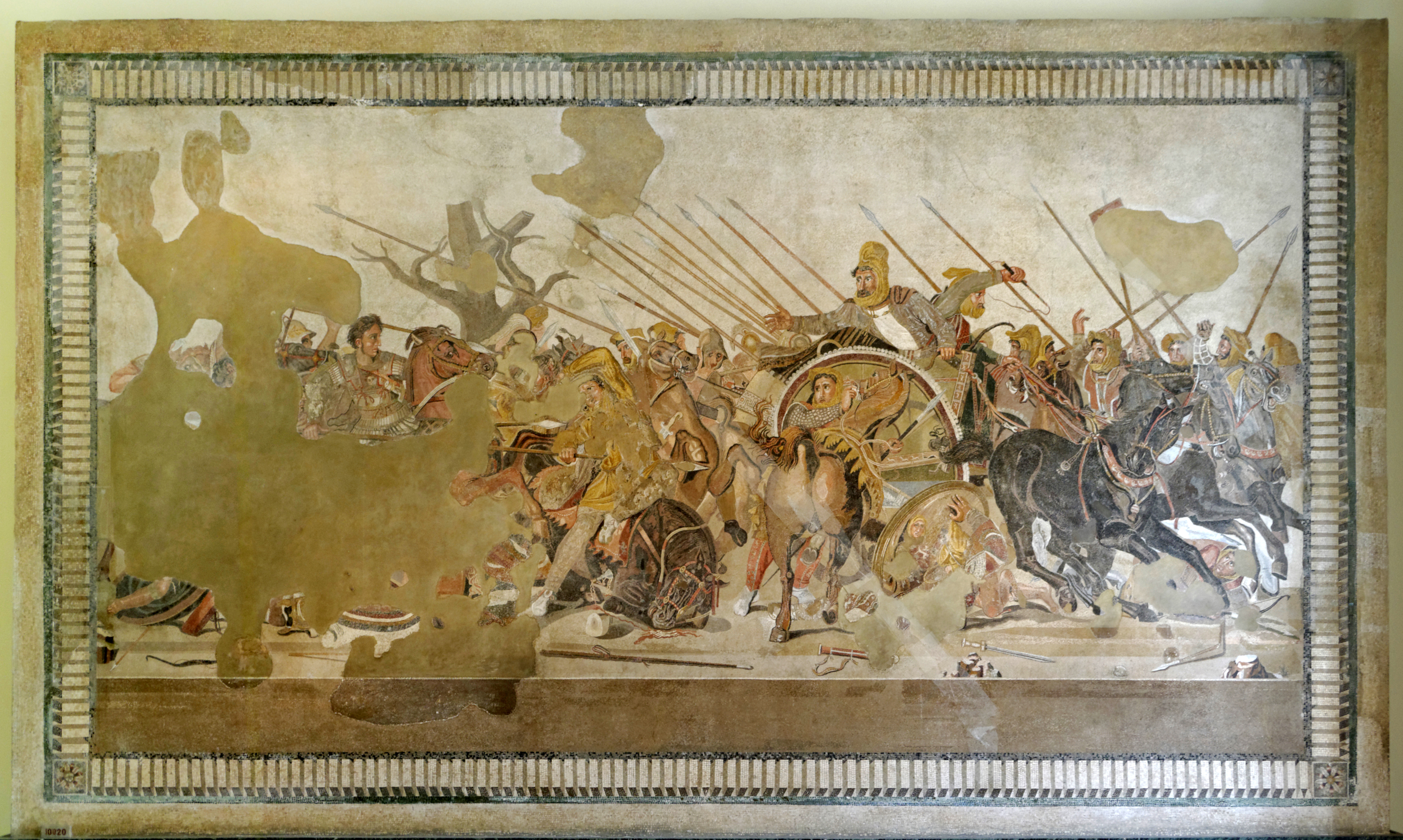
- Artist: Philoxenus of Eretria or Apelles (orig. painting)
- Year: c. 120–100 BC
- Type: Mosaic
- Dimensions: 272 cm × 513 cm (8 ft 11 in × 16 ft 8 in)
- Location: National Archaeological Museum, Naples

The Alexander Mosaic, also known as the Battle of Issus Mosaic, is a Roman floor mosaic originally from the House of the Faun in Pompeii, Italy.

It is typically dated between c. 120 and 100 BC and depicts a battle between the armies of Alexander the Great and Darius III of Persia. This work of art is a combination of different artistic traditions such as Italic, Hellenistic, and Roman. The mosaic is considered Roman based on the broader context of its time and location in relation to the later Roman Republic. The original is preserved in the National Archaeological Museum, Naples. The mosaic is believed to be a copy of a late fourth-century BC or early third-century BC Hellenistic painting, perhaps by Philoxenus of Eretria or Apelles.

== Subject ==
The mosaic represents a battle in which Alexander of Macedonia charges the Persian king Darius III, the commander-in-chief of the Persian army. Alexander fought Darius III in a series of battles over control of the Persian Empire. Alexander defeated Darius at the Battle of Issus and again two years later at the Battle of Gaugamela. The work is traditionally believed to show the Battle of Issus.

The battle scene depicts more than 50 men. It stands out among ancient works of art because it represents a large group of soldiers, depicts each figure with meticulous attention to detail, expertly captures the expressions that appear on the warriors' faces, and uses muted colors. The mosaic features many figures in a very large space. The two most distinguished and recognizable figures are Alexander and Darius III.

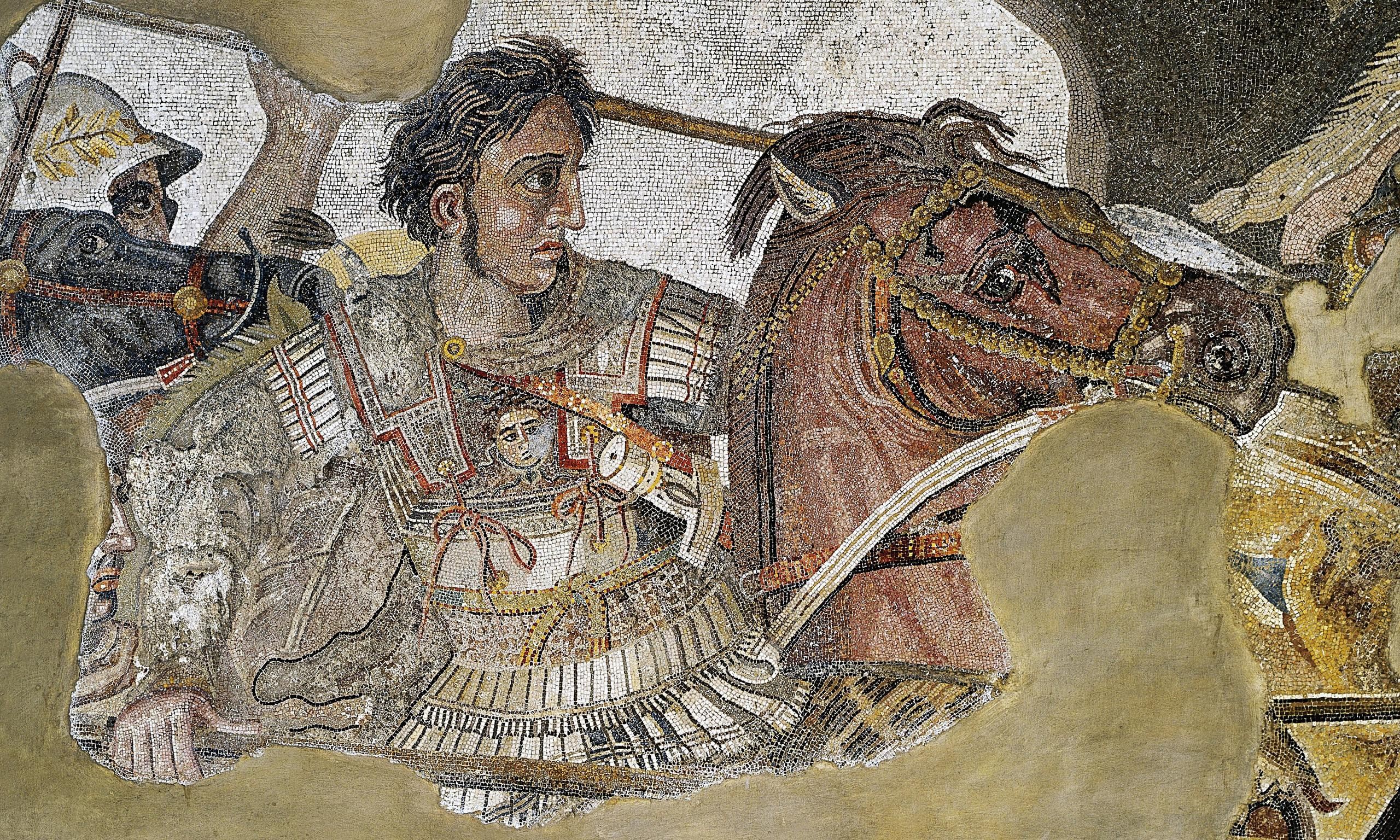
Detail showing Alexander

On the left side of the mosaic, Alexander of Macedonia is seen without a helmet, in a profile view facing right. He is posed in action with his lance in his right arm. An enemy cavalryman grips its shaft below its sharp head as his mount tumbles to the ground. Alexander wears a linen breastplate, or linothorax, with the head of the Gorgon Medusa, the traditional emblem of Athena, and he rides his horse Bucephalus. He is shown with a lot of curly soft-textured hair. Alexander's gaze is trained on Darius.

Darius III is reaching out to the dying soldier, while another soldier tries to get the king's chariot out of the battle scene. At this precise moment, Darius is making the order, because the Persian spears are still pointed in the direction of the Macedonians, and the king is riding in a chariot being wheeled around. Darius and his charioteer take up a large portion of the right half of the mosaic. There are various precarious elements surrounding him. In the background Darius' charioteer whips the horses to flee from the battle scene. There is visible fear and anxiety in the Persian king's face, seen especially in his furrowed brows and deep frown. Darius is positioned holding a bow in his left hand while his right arm is outstretched toward Alexander. Darius' brother Oxyathres is also portrayed, sacrificing himself to save the king directly in front of the king's chariot, holding the reins to his horse. The horse is a large figure that draws much attention because of its backward facing positioning. The horse's hindquarters are facing the audience with a raised tail.

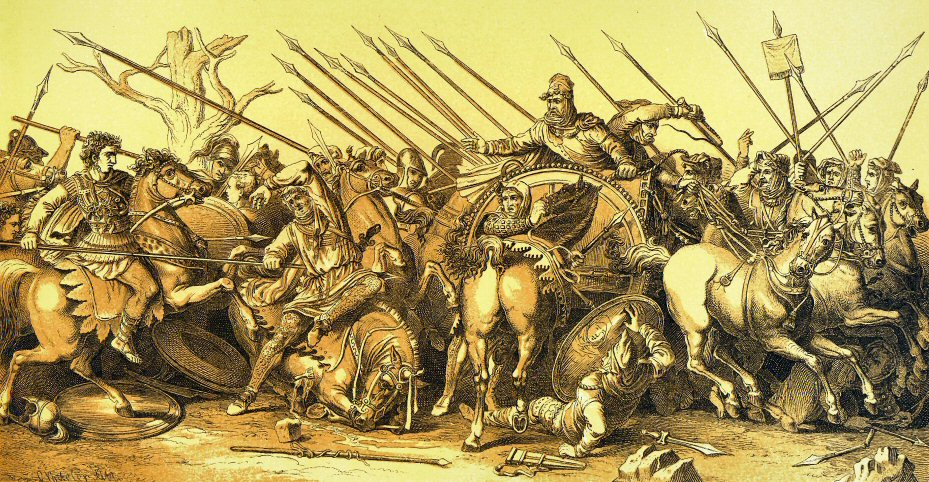
1893 reconstruction of the mosaic

Radical foreshortening—as in the central horse, seen from behind—and the use of shading to convey a sense of mass and volume enhance the naturalistic effect of the scene. Repeated diagonal spears, clashing metal, and the crowding of men and horses evoke the din of battle. At the same time, action is arrested by dramatic details such as the fallen horse and the Persian soldier in the foreground who watches his own death throes reflected in a shield.

== History of the mosaic ==
=== Production ===
The mosaic is made of approximately one and a half million tiny colored tiles called tesserae, arranged in gradual curves called opus vermiculatum (also known as worm work, because they seem to replicate the slow motion of a crawling worm) rather than opus signinum or other forms of stone chips put in mortar. These tesserae are approximately 0.08 inches (2.0 mm) wide, and it is estimated that more than four million pieces were used in the mosaic.

The color scale of Roman mosaics are extremely rich in gradation. The process of gathering materials for mosaics was a complex undertaking since the color scale was based solely on the pieces of marble that could be found in nature. Following the style of many other Hellenistic artists, the entire mosaic is composed of reds, yellows, black, and white. The mosaic is an unusually detailed work for a private residence and was likely commissioned by a wealthy person or family. There is evidence that the mosaic was imported from the East, as there are places where some details are distorted and changed. Some scholars argue that this is evidence that the mosaic was created in pieces and reassembled in Pompeii.

The fact that this scene was made to be viewed in the house of a Roman civilian reveals that Alexander the Great was more than just a heroic image to the Romans. Because Roman leaders followed after Alexander's image, Roman civilians also aspired to emulate the power he represented. Since the mosaic was arranged on the floor where the patron could receive guests, it was the first decorative object a visitor would see upon entering that room. Modern research indicates that there may have been multiple columns removed from the colonnade to improve lighting and viewing of the mosaic.

Similar to Greek paintings, the mosaic of Alexander the Great lacks rich iconography toward the top, which, on a vertical surface, would have been considerably higher above the viewer's line of sight and garnered less creative attention. This is one way in which the two forms of art are comparable to one another. As a bonus, the mosaic displays the realism and naturalism typical of Greek portrayals of humans, especially regarding facial expression, emotional tone, and anatomical structure.

=== Originality ===
The Alexander Mosaic is believed to be a copy of a Hellenistic Greek painting made during the fourth century BC. The style of the mosaic is distinctly Greek in that it depicts close up portraits of the main heroes of the battle. Typically within Greek battle scenes the heroes are difficult to define within the commotion. The mosaic contains very specific details that scholars believe would have been lost if the mosaic was created any later than a couple hundred years after the battle. It is a commonly accepted belief concerning the Alexander mosaic that one must use the Greek original to interpret the meaning of the Roman copy. The debate among scholars over the significance of the Roman copy is that it cannot and should not be interpreted in the same cultural and historical context as the Greek original. Some believe that in doing so, it takes away both context and achievement from Roman artists. The mosaic is held to be a copy either of a painting by Aristides of Thebes, or of a lost late fourth-century BC fresco by the painter Philoxenus of Eretria. The latter is mentioned by Pliny the Elder (XXXV, 110) as a commission for the Macedonian king Cassander.

=== Modern history ===
The Alexander Mosaic was preserved due to the volcanic ash that collected over the mosaic during the eruption of Mount Vesuvius in the city of Pompeii in AD 79. This Roman artwork was found inlaid into the ground of the House of the Faun between two open peristyles. The mosaic was used to decorate the floor of a second tablinum or exedra (an open room or area that contains seating that is used for conversing). The House of the Faun was a large estate comprising one whole block in Pompeii; this is an area of approximately 3,000 square meters.

As a significant artwork and piece of history, the scene of the mosaic remained in the social and cultural sphere. The mosaic was rediscovered in 1831 in Pompeii, Italy, and was later transported to Naples in September 1843. The Alexander Mosaic is now displayed on a wall and preserved in Naples. Until recently it has been on display at the Museo Archeologico Nazionale, although currently its site is covered with a facsimile banner as the mosaic is being restored in an adjacent room. In 1956, the Alexander Mosaic was featured on the ₯1,000 banknote.

=== Modern copy ===
In 2003, the International Center for the Study and Teaching of Mosaic (CISIM) in Ravenna, Italy, proposed creating a copy of the mosaic. After CISIM received approval for the project, the mosaic master Severo Bignami and his eight-person team took a large photograph of the mosaic, made a tracing of the image with a dark marker and created a negative impression of it.

The team composed the mosaic in sections in 44 clay frames, trying to preserve the pieces of the mosaic in the exact positions they are in the original mosaic. They had to keep the plates wet at all times. Then they pressed a tissue on the clay to create an image of the outlines of the mosaic in the clay. The team recreated the mosaic with approximately 2 million pieces of various marble types. When they had placed all the pieces, they covered the result with a layer of glue and gauze and pulled it out of the clay. They placed each section on synthetic concrete and then united the sections with the compound of glass, wool, and plastic.

The project took 22 months and cost the equivalent of $216,000. The copy was installed in the House of the Faun in 2005.

=== Conservation ===
In 2015, IPERION CH, the Integrated Platform for the European Research Infrastructure ON Cultural Heritage, researched the mosaic and used various non-invasive analysis techniques to discover the physical composition of the mosaic, in addition to learning which parts were original and which were added after rediscovery. In 2018, a photogrammetric model was created of the mosaic, revealing flaws and cracks invisible to the human eye.

In January 2021 the National Archaeological Museum of Naples began a major restoration project to attempt to conserve the mosaic. In the initial assessment of the mosaic, multiple issues were discovered, including detached tesserae, cracks, bulges, and surface depressions. Some areas already had been treated, such as multiple cracks that had been covered by thin paper bandages in a "velinatura" technique, in prior restoration efforts.

=== The Alexander Mosaic in the History of the House ===
The House of the Faun at Pompeii was immediately recognized by its size and decoration as one of the town’s most important houses. Adolf Hoffmann argues that the House of the Faun was constructed in two principal phases.

Hoffmann refers to the first phase as the "first House of the Faun" and has recently attempted a reconstruction. In the first half, or at latest by the middle of the second century BC, the two atria (from image: 27 and 7) and the first peristyle (from image: 36, originally in the Doric order) were constructed. Another distinctive feature of this first phase was the absence of the Alexander Mosaic and its exedra from the north side of the first peristyle (37). A large room, underlying the later rooms to the east of the Alexander exedra (from image: 42, 38, and 43), served the first peristyle as its principal exedra during this first phase. Overall, the first incarnation of the House of the Faun dated back to c. 180 BC, occupied two-thirds of the insula and consisted of two atria, one small house and one peristyle.

According to Hoffmann, the Alexander exedra was not originally part of the layout of the first peristyle. Hoffmann has observed that the first peristyle, originally built in the Doric order, belongs to the earliest phase of the house. The layout of the first peristyle is the key to the house's design, in both practice and theory. The first peristyle dominates the house not only visually and functionally, but it also commands the design, determining the locations and the dimensions of the other major parts. The room is so strategically placed that it would not be an exaggeration to say that the rest of the house had been designed and built around the site with the great treasure of mosaic art set in its floor.

Next, Hoffmann argues, the second phase of the house, the "second House of the Faun", was commenced through an extensive rebuilding and renovating of the first house. The first peristyle (36) was "refashioned in the Ionic order and was reconstructed into a new peristyle. The Alexander exedra (37) was constructed, facing south, onto the first peristyle. A major renovation phase beginning c. 110 BC and ending c. 75 BC comprised a new decoration in the so-called First Style (including all the well-known mosaic pavements), as well as the insertion of a second entrance into the tetrastyle atrium, a switch from Doric to Ionic in the portico of the small peristyle, and the construction of the large north peristyle.

In addition to the Alexander Mosaic, several other floor mosaics representing Nilotic events and theatrical masks surround the Alexander Mosaic. This piece of art draws from various artistic periods and movements, including Roman, Hellenistic, and Italic.

Eight pictorial mosaics were laid in the House of the Faun as part of a major renovation program of the early first century BC. Many of them have iconography resembling themes found in Ptolemaic Egypt. For example, one triptych mosaic features a Nilotic landscape with Egyptian animals, fish emblemas, an emblema depicting a cat attacking a bird, and emblemas of other animals also found in Ptolemaic art. It has traditionally been held that these compositions were laid at different times, the Alexander Mosaic in c. 110 BC and the Nilotic triptych in c. 80 BC. This view rests on the observation that the bases of the threshold columns were cut back to accommodate the panels of the triptych, and on a perception that the triptych is less technically accomplished than the Alexander Mosaic.

== Gallery ==
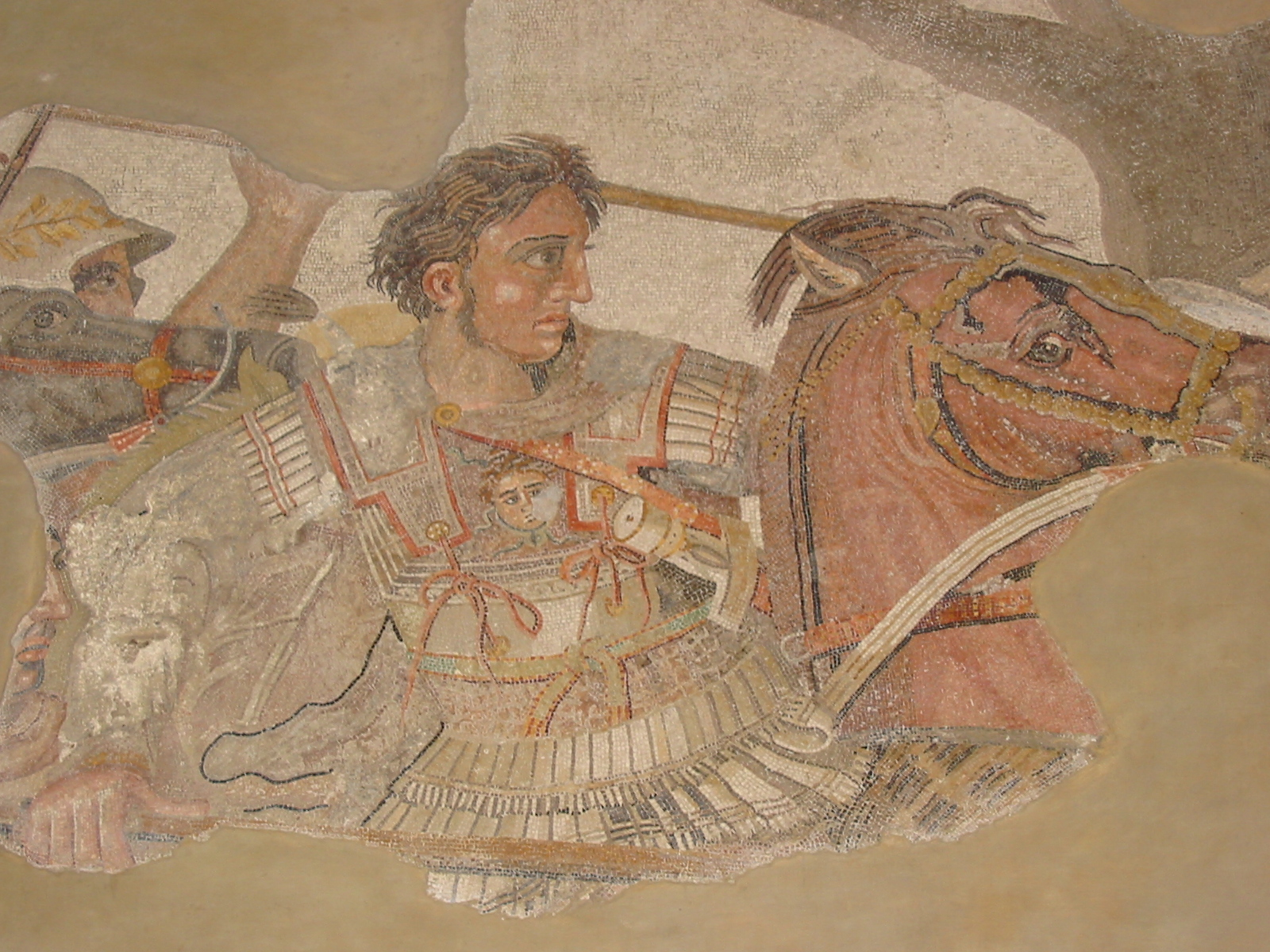
Close up of Alexander

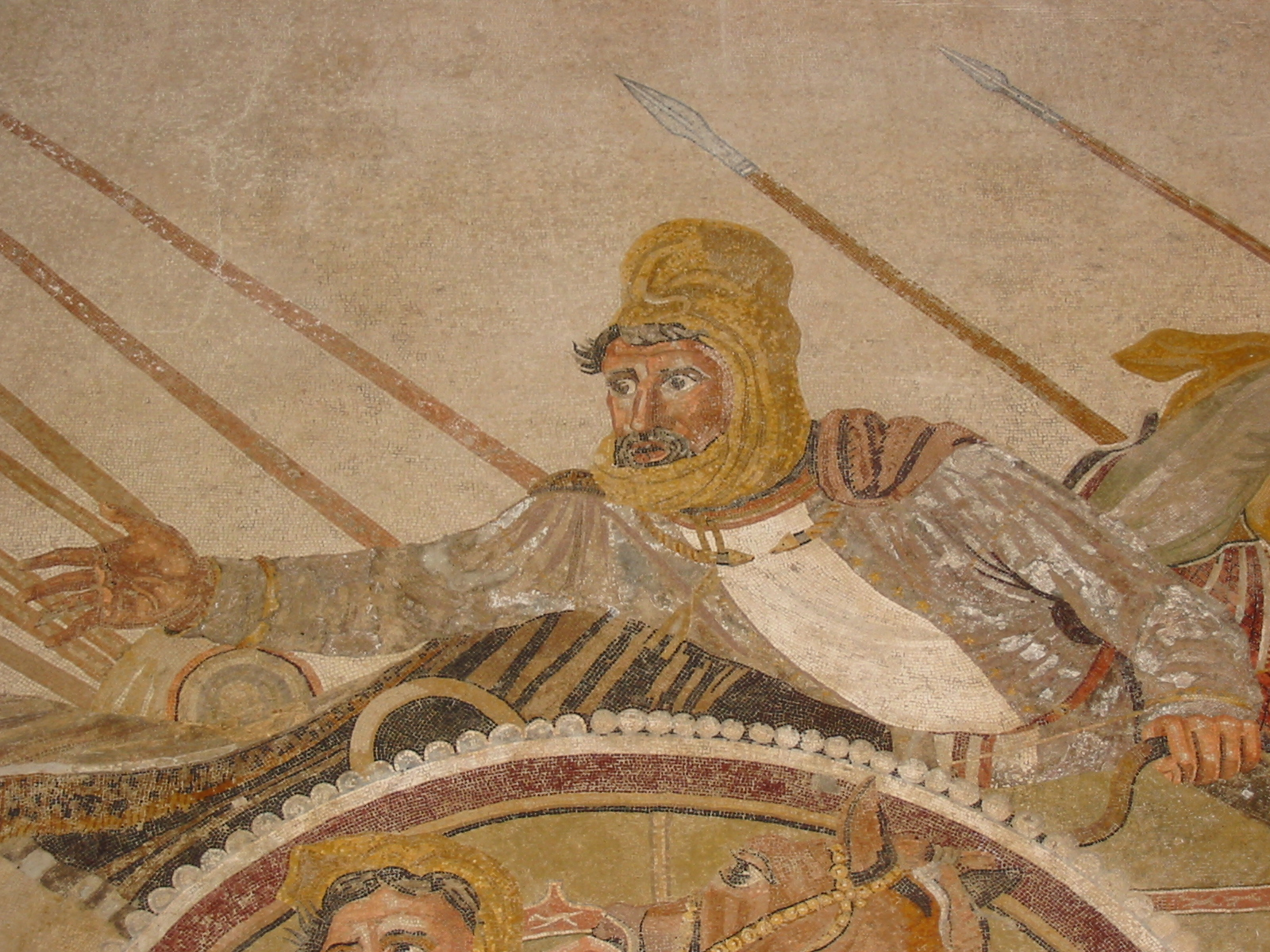
Close up of Darius

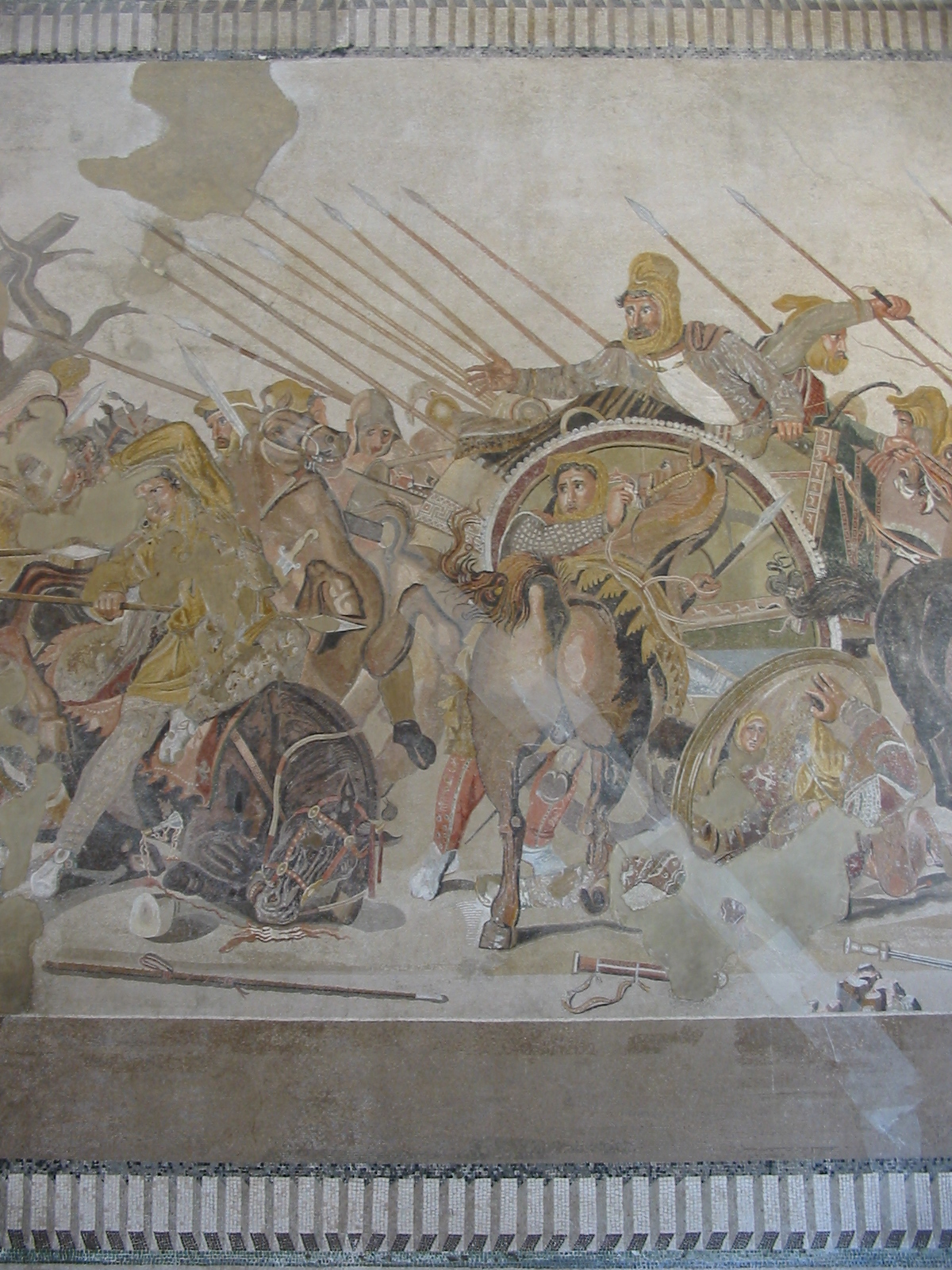
Centre detail of the mosaic

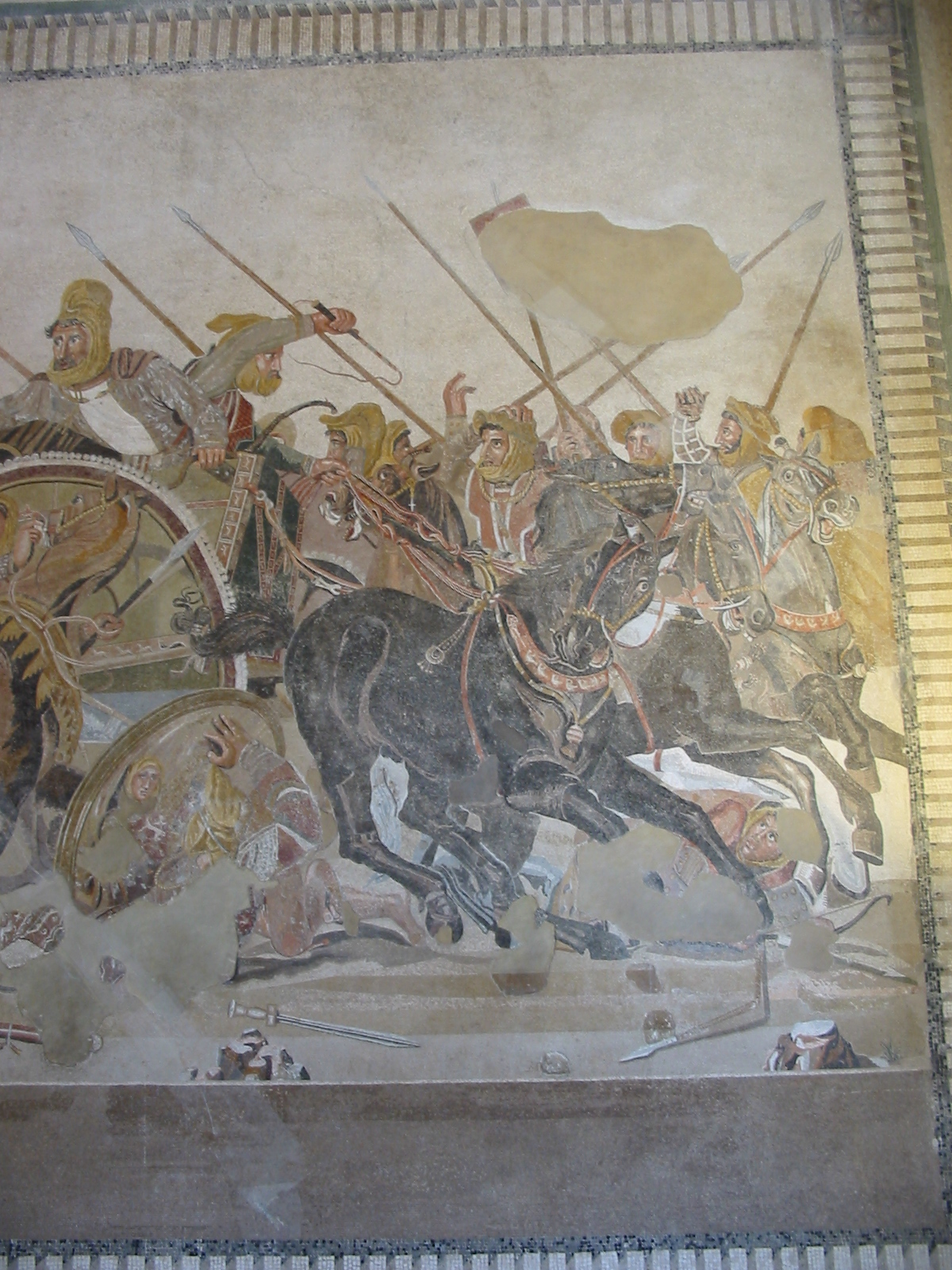
Detail of the Persians on the right side of the mosaic

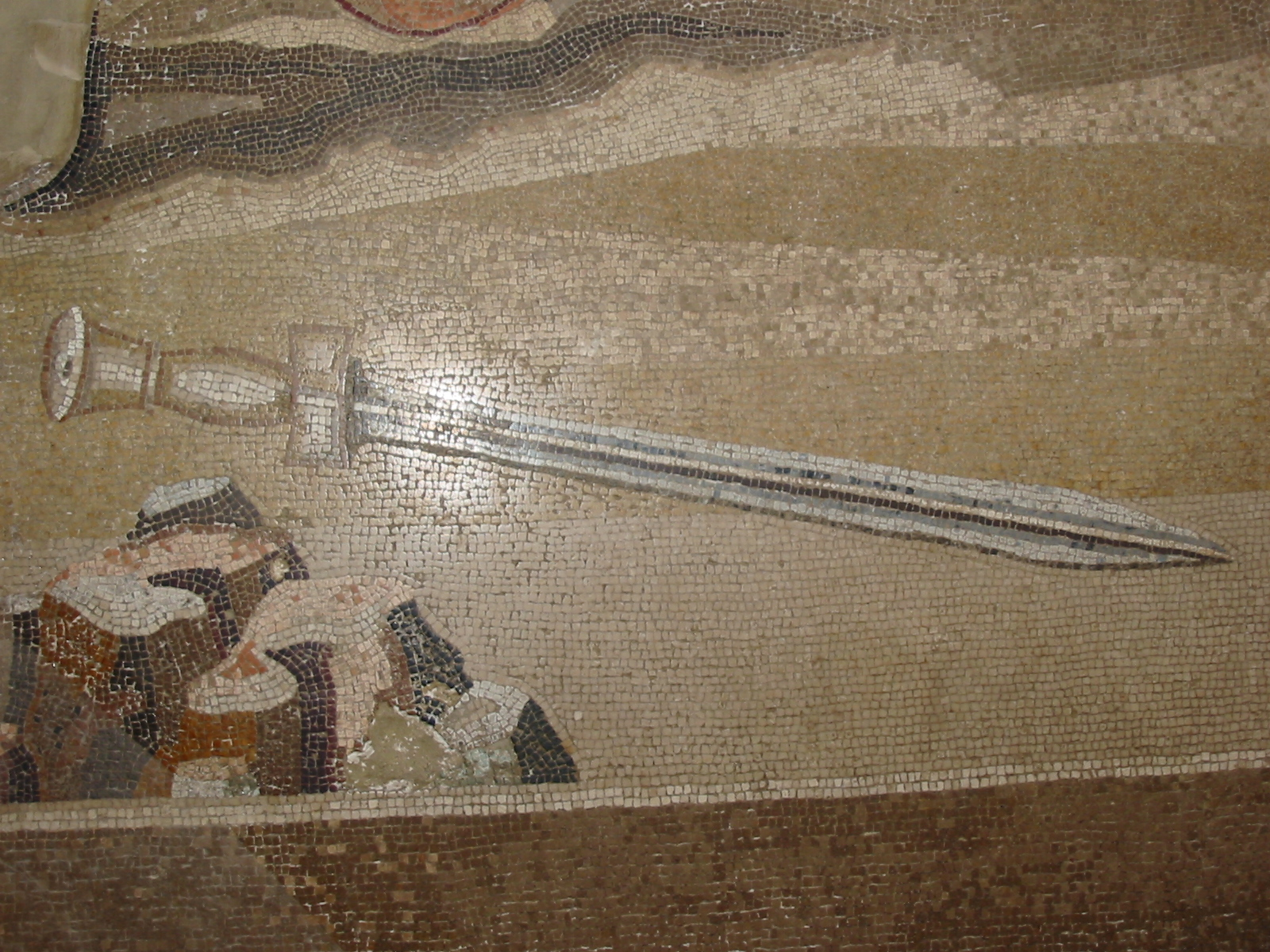
Detail of a fallen sword from the bottom right of the mosaic (showing the individual tesserae)
