= House of the Silver Wedding =

Archaeological remains of a Roman house in Pompeii

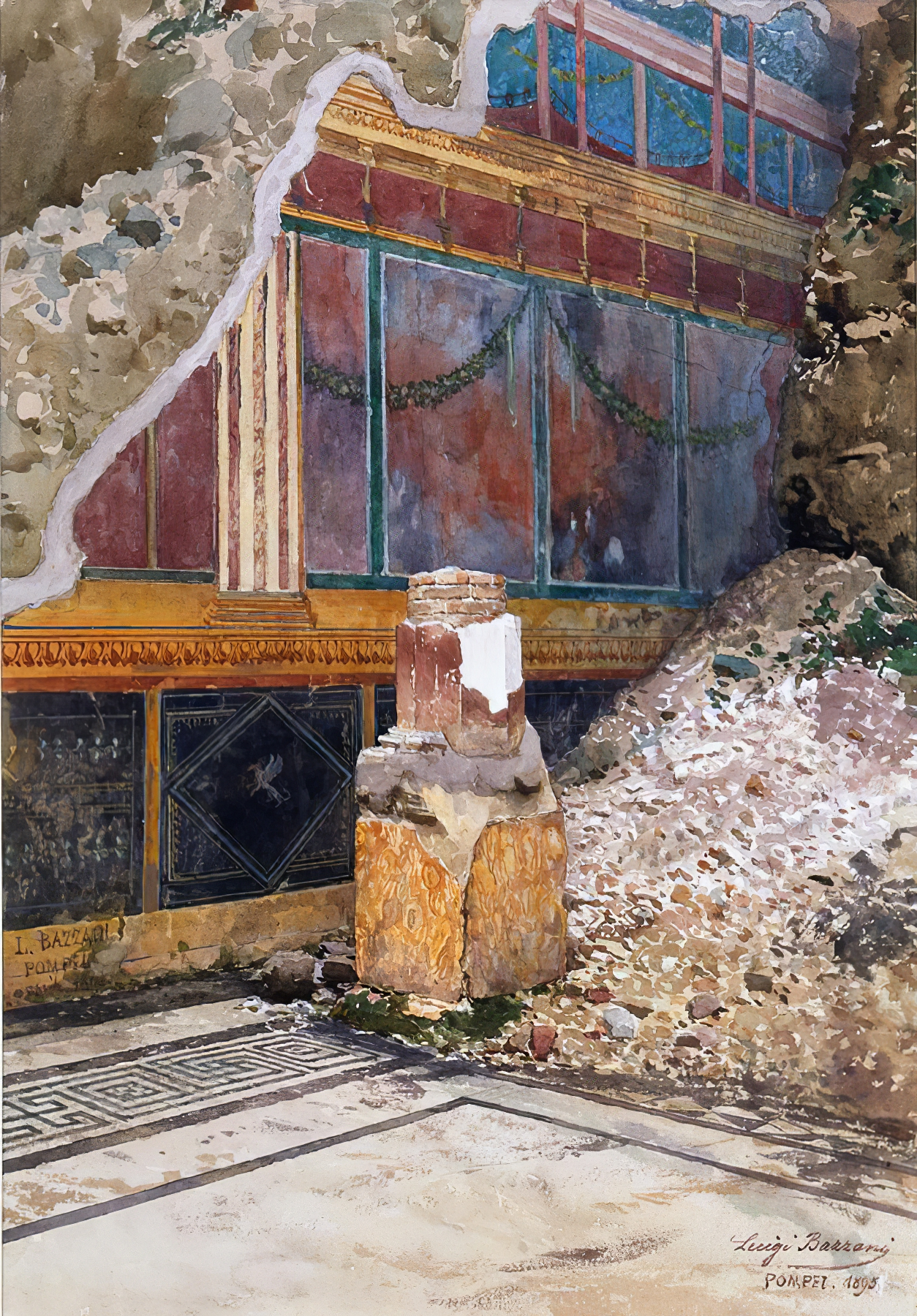
House of the Silver Wedding in Pompeii watercolor by Luigi Bazzani

The House of the Silver Wedding is the name given to the archaeological remains of a Roman house in Pompeii, buried in the ash from the Eruption of Mount Vesuvius in 79 AD. The house was excavated in 1893 and was named after the silver wedding anniversary of Umberto I of Italy and Margherita of Savoy, which took place in that year.

The paintings in the house were fully published in one volume in 2002. The publication was part of a project by the German Archaeological Institute to record houses in Pompeii.

== Description ==
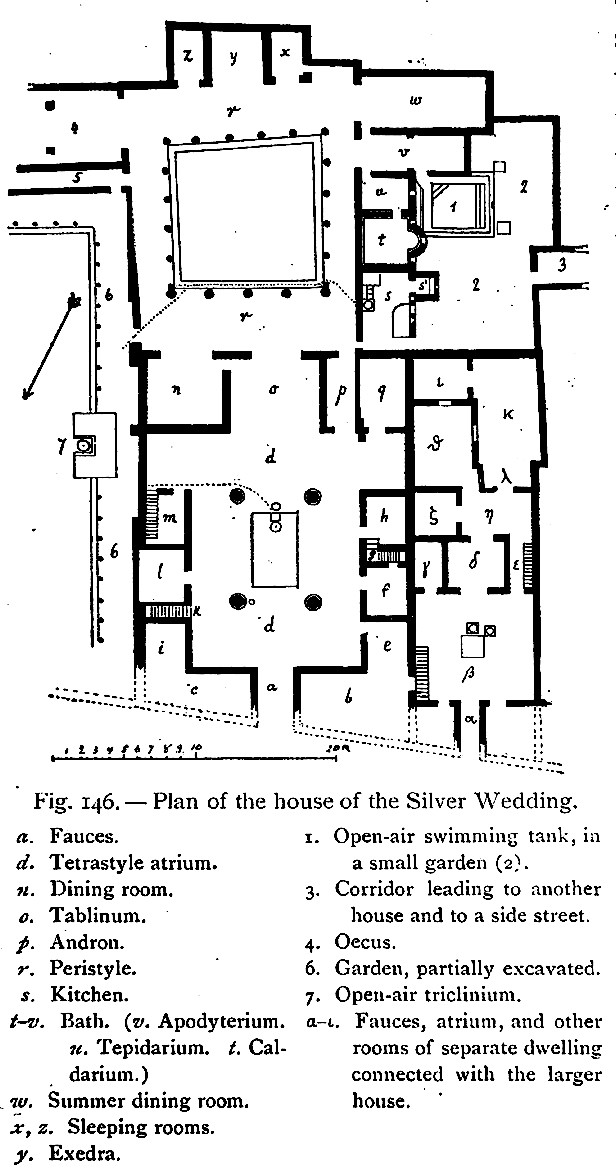
Floor plan of the house

The house is in the last side street off Via Vesuvio, next to an as-yet unexcavated part of the site. Built in the 2nd century BC and renovated in the early 1st century AD, it was the domus of a wealthy resident. Its architecture is classical and it bears fine decoration in the atrium, which has four tall Corinthian columns supporting the roof and an elegantly ornamented exedra. It is generally considered to be the finest tetrastyle atrium in the city, with its compluviate roof with palmette antefixes and lion-headed gutter spouts.

There are two gardens: the largest with a central pool and a triclinium; the other with a bath-house, open-air swimming pool, kitchen, and a living room that has a mosaic floor, wall paintings and a barrel-vaulted ceiling supported by four octagonal columns decorated in imitation of porphyry.
