= Margaret C. Miller =

Classical archaeologist

Margaret C. Miller FAHA

Academic background
- Education: University of British Columbia; Oxford University
- Alma mater: Harvard University
- Thesis: Perserie : the arts of the East in fifth-century Athens (1985)

Academic work
- Institutions: McMaster University; University of Toronto; University of Sydney

Margaret Christina Miller FAHA (born 1955) is an archaeologist and the Arthur and Renee George Professor of Classical Archaeology at the University of Sydney.

== Career ==
Miller holds a BA from the University of British Columbia, a MA from Oxford University and an AM from Harvard University. Her 1985 PhD, also from Harvard, was titled "Perserie : the arts of the East in fifth-century Athens". She then continued her studies in the Classics at the American School of Classical Studies at Athens.

She has participated in archaeological digs in England, Egypt and Turkey and has been a team leader (2012) and co-director (2013, 2014, 2019) of the Zagora Archaeological Project, excavating at the coastal town of Zagora in Greece.

Before moving to the University of Sydney, where she is the Arthur and Renee George Professor of Classical Archaeology, Miller worked in Canada at McMaster University and the University of Toronto.

Miller was elected a Fellow of the Australian Academy of the Humanities in 2011 and the following year was made a Corresponding Member, German Archaeological Institute.

== Selected publications ==
=== Books ===
- Miller, Margaret Christina (19 August 2004). Athens and Persia in the fifth century B.C. : a study in cultural receptivity. Cambridge University Press (published 1997). ISBN 978-0-521-60758-2.
- Miller, Margaret Christina; Csapo, Eric, eds. (2003). Poetry, theory, praxis : the social life of myth, word and image in ancient Greece : essays in honour of William J. Slater. Oxbow. ISBN 978-1-84217-101-1.
- Csapo, Eric; Miller, Margaret C., eds. (15 January 2007). The origins of theater in ancient Greece and beyond : from ritual to drama. Cambridge University Press (published 2007). ISBN 978-0-521-83682-1.
