= Philoxenus of Eretria =

Ancient Greek painter of renown (active c. 330-315BC)

Philoxenus of Eretria (Ancient Greek: Φιλόξενος ὁ Ἐρετριεύς) was a painter from Eretria. He was a disciple of Nicomachus of Thebes, whose speed in painting he imitated and even surpassed, having discovered new and rapid methods of coloring. According to Pliny, a picture of his was inferior to none, in particular his depiction of a battle between Alexander the Great and Darius III, which he painted for King Cassander.

A similar subject is represented in the celebrated Alexander Mosaic found in the House of the Faun in Pompeii. As a disciple of Nicomachus, who flourished about 360 BC, and as the painter of the battle of Issus (333 BC) (or possibly the battle of Gaugamela in 331 BC; Pliny simply states that it was "a picture representing one of the battles between Alexander and Darius"), Philoxenus must have flourished in the age of Alexander, from about 330 BC and onwards. The words of Pliny, "Cassandro regi", "Cassander being king", if taken literally, would mean that the creation of the original picture must have taken place some time after 317-315 BC, during the reign of Cassander in Macedon.
