= René Neuville =

French diplomat and archaeologist (1899–1952)

- Born: 30 October 1899; Gibraltar
- Died: 23 June 1952 (aged 52); Jerusalem
- Awards: Legion of Honour
- Position held: Consul General of France in Jerusalem (1946–1952)

René Neuville (30 October 1899, Gibraltar – 23 June 1952, Jerusalem) was a French prehistorian and diplomat posted to the French consulate in Jerusalem.

== Diplomatic career ==
Neuville's father was the consul general of France in Gibraltar. He entered the diplomatic service at a young age and was first posted to Vintimille in Italy. In 1926, he was named chancellor to the French consulate in Jerusalem, where he stayed for eleven years.

He was appointed to Alicante in 1937, then with the onset of the Second World War to Gibraltar and Morocco, where he continued his archaeological research. In 1943, he was in Algiers and Tunis. In 1946, he returned to Jerusalem as consul general and resumed his archaeological work, though he was also occupied with diplomatic duties.

== Archaeology ==
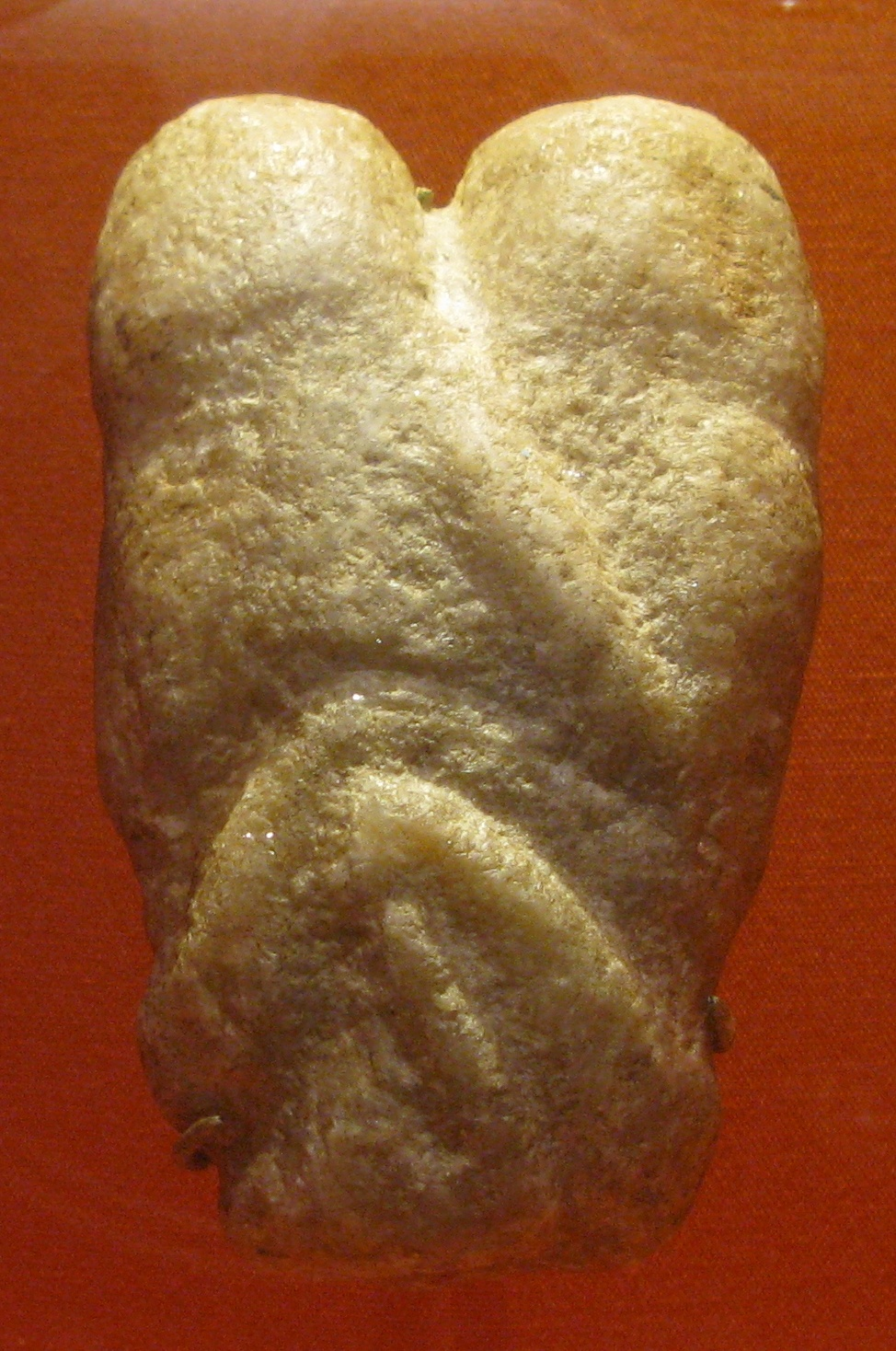
The Ain Sakhri Lovers, a Natufian sculpture identified by Neuville.

Neuville's interest in archaeology began in Italy, where he studied Egyptian epigraphy. Arriving in Palestine in 1926, he was introduced to the region's prehistory by Alexis Mallon, head of the Pontifical Biblical Institute in Jerusalem, and Denis Buzy and P. Duvigneau of the Carmelite monastery in Bethlehem. Mallon in particular became a mentor to Neuville; the two went on to collaborate on excavations at Umm Qatafa, and Neuville assisted Mallon at Teleilat el Ghassul. Through Buzy and Duvigneau, he developed ties with the Bedouin of Wadi Khureitun, who would sell their monastery artefacts they found when clearing out caves in the Judaean Desert. One of these artefacts was the figurine Neuville dubbed the Ain Sakhri Lovers, which he was able to date by revisiting the cave where it was found and sieving through the sediment excavated by the Bedouin.

In 1933, while exploring a cave in Jebel Qafzeh, near Nazareth, Neuville discovered the remains of five peoples buried in the Middle Palaeolithic.

Neuville was also interested in paleontology and malacology. He described two new taxa of Levantina and Loripes, though he never published them. After his death, his extensive collection of mollusc shells from the Levant, Sinai, North Africa and France was donated to the Hebrew University of Jerusalem, along with his library of malacological works.

== Personal life ==
Neuville's son, Pierre Neuville, also pursued a diplomatic career and conducted archaeological and palaeontological research.

== Selected publications ==
- Avec Boureau R. Squelettes palestiniens du premier âge de bronze. In: Bulletins et Mémoires de la Société d'anthropologie de Paris, VIII^{e} Série. Tome 1 fascicule 4–6, 1930. pp. 33–36.
- « Quartiers d'Orange » de Palestine. In: Bulletin de la Société préhistorique de France, tome 28, No. 5, 1931. pp. 264–265.
- Emmanuel Passemard; Pierre-Eudoxe Dubalen; André Vayson de Pradenne; René Neuville (1931). "La Question Chalossienne". Bulletin de la Société préhistorique de France (in French). 28: 289–293 – via Persée.
- L'Acheuléen supérieur de la Grotte d'Oumm-Qatafa (Palestine), Paris, Masson, 1931.
- Avec Alexis Mallon, Robert Koeppel :Teleilāt Ghassūl, I : compte rendu des fouilles de l'Institut biblique pontifical, 1929-1932, Rome, Piazza della Pilotta, 1934.
- Avec Armand Ruhlmann :La place du paléolithique ancien dans le quaternaire marocain, Casablanca : Farairre, 1941.
- Avec Ruhlmann A. : L'âge de l'Homme fossile de Rabat. In: Bulletins et Mémoires de la Société d'anthropologie de Paris, IX^{e} Série. Tome 3, 1942. pp. 74–88.
- Demande d'appui pour le classement du site préhistorique de Sidi Abd er Rahman au Maroc. In: Comptes rendus des séances de l'Académie des Inscriptions et Belles-Lettres, 86^{e} année, N. 2–3, 1942. pp. 155–156.
- Heurs et malheurs des consuls de France à Jérusalem aux XVII^{e}, XVIII^{e} et XIX^{e} siècles 2, Jérusalem, Azriel Printing Works, 1948.
- Le Néolithique marocain à anses funiculaires internes, Le Mans, Imprimerie Monnoyer, 1948.
- avec la collaboration de MM. Yaacov Bentor, G. Haas, J. Perrot et Raymond Vaufrey :Le paléolithique et le mésolithique du désert de Judée, Paris, Masson, 1951.

- Prix Bordin 1952 de l’Académie des inscriptions et belles-lettres.

- Station acheuléenne du Sinaï septentrional : Djebel el-Faleq. In: Bulletin de la Société préhistorique de France, tome 49, n^{os} 1-2, 1952. pp. 77–80.
