= Tekoa (Israeli settlement) =

Israeli settlement in the West Bank

Tekoa: תְּקוֹעַ (Hebrew)
- Israeli settlement
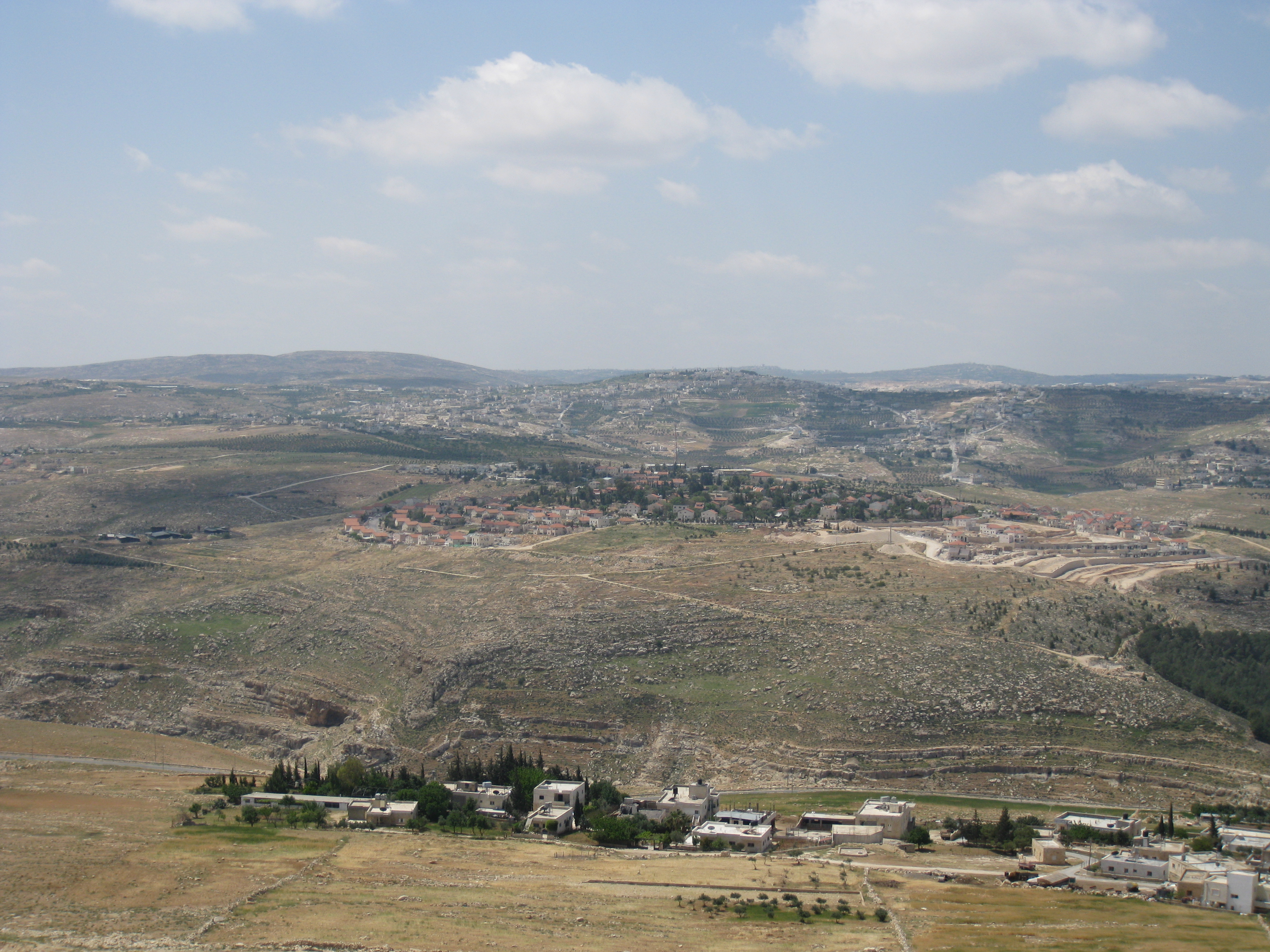
- View of Tekoa from Herodion

- Location within the Southern West Bank
- Coordinates: 31°39′11″N 35°13′45″E
- Country: Palestine
- District: Judea and Samaria Area
- Council: Gush Etzion
- Region: West Bank
- Founded: 1975, 1977
- Founder: Nahal
- Population (2024): 4,834

Tekoa (Hebrew: תְּקוֹעַ) is an Israeli settlement organized as a community settlement in the West Bank, located 20 km northeast of Hebron, 16 km south of Jerusalem and in the immediate vicinity of the Palestinian village of Tuqu'. It falls under the jurisdiction of Gush Etzion Regional Council. In 2024 it had a population of 4,834.

The international community considers Israeli settlements in the West Bank illegal under international law, but the Israeli government disputes this.

== History ==
=== Founding ===
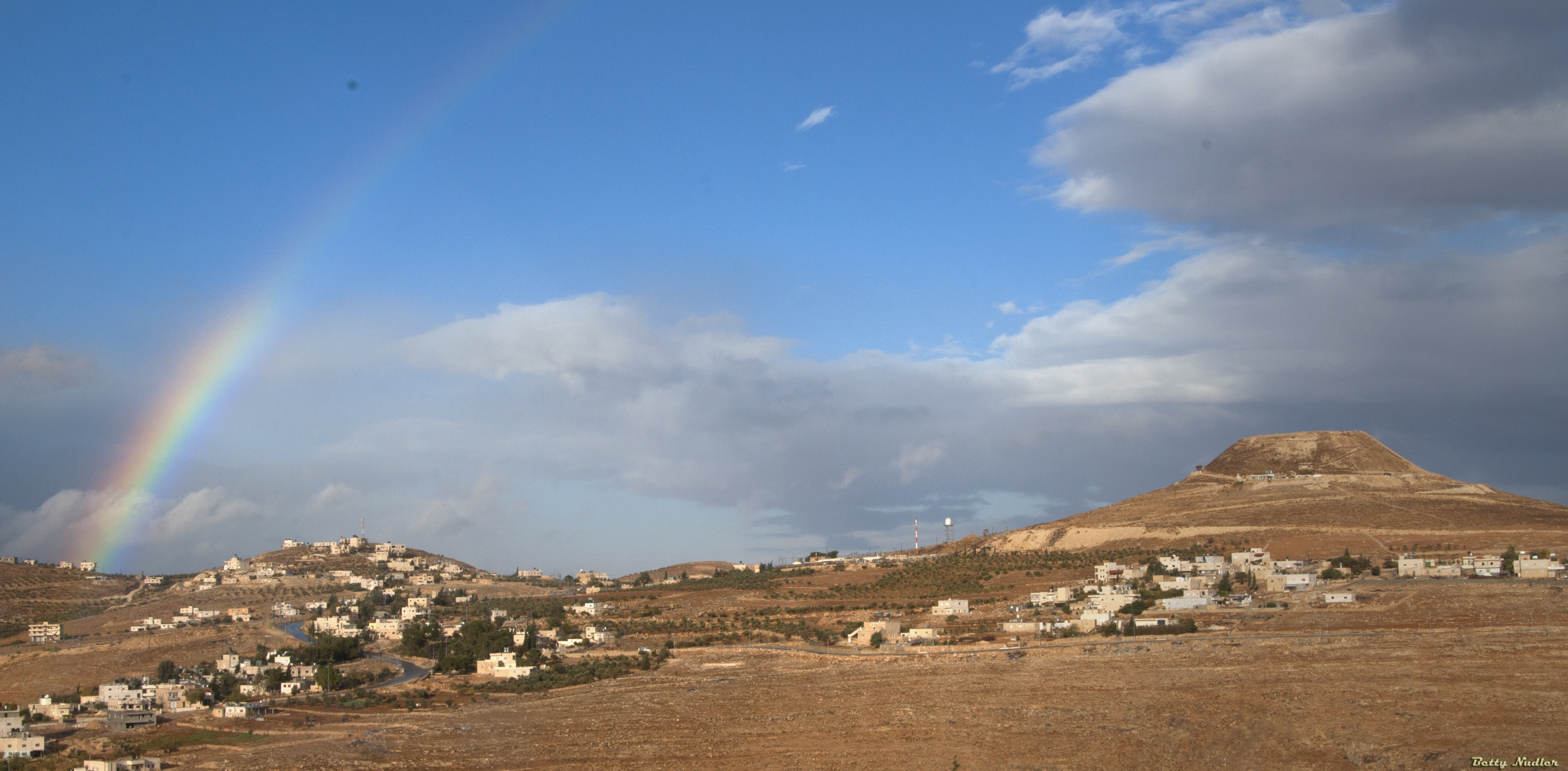
View of Herodium from Tekoa.

Tekoa was established in 1975 as a Nahal outpost in the vicinity of the Palestinian village of Tuqu'. In 1977 it was handed over to civilian residents. It is named after the ancient town of Tekoa, hometown of the biblical prophet Amos, which is usually identified with Khirbet Tuqu' (located 3 km away adjacent to the Palestinian village of Tuqu').

Tekoa is built on 1071 dunam of land which, according to ARIJ, Israel confiscated from the Palestinian citizens of Tuqu'.

The town is located 5 miles south of Bethlehem at the foot of Herodion ("Herod's Palace").

=== Archaeology and landmarks ===
Ancient caves and caves that were dug in the karst chalk stone of the Nachal Tekoa or Wadi Khureitun, named after Chariton the Confessor, by monks from the Lavras of Saint Chariton and his successor Euthymius the Great, are right behind Tekoa.

== Geography ==
Tekoa is located 2,177 feet (664 meters) above sea level on a ridge surrounded on three sides by a deep canyon, Nahal Tekoa, that runs east to the Dead Sea. It has a mean annual rainfall of 410mm, an average annual temperature of 17 degree Celsius, and an average annual humidity of c. 60 percent.

== Demographics ==
Tekoa is populated by a mix of religious Zionists and secular Israelis. Many new immigrants from the former Soviet Union also live in Tekoa. In 2015, the population numbered 3,671.

The former chief rabbi of Tekoa, Menachem Froman, a founding member of Gush Emunim, maintained close ties with PLO and Hamas leaders. Rabbi Froman taught at the local hesder yeshiva headed by Rabbi Adin Steinsaltz. Froman died in 2013.

== Economy ==
In 1989, the Tekoa Agro-Technology Farm established in 1986 was named Enterprise of the Year by the Israeli Journal of Agricultural Settlements.

== Voting Patterns ==
In the 2026 election, 69 percent of voters in Tekoa voted for the parties of the right-wing coalition led by Benjamin Netanyahu, while 16 percent voted for the parties of the center-left coalition led by Gadi Eisenkot and 0.2 percent voted for the Arab parties. An additional 4.1 percent voted for the Reservists, and 8 percent voted for Amcha Yisrael. Voter turnout increased 28 percent from the 2022 election.

== Arab-Israeli conflict ==
In May 2001, two Israeli boys from Tekoa, Koby Mandell and Yosef Ishran, were killed, by unknown person(s) who were never apprehended.

In September 2001 an Israeli was shot and killed in Tekoa when militants opened fire on her family's car.

In February 2002, two Israelis were killed in a shooting attack near Tekoa. The Al-Aqsa Martyrs' Brigades claimed responsibility for the attack.

== Status under international law ==
Like all Israeli settlements in the Israeli-occupied territories, Tekoa is considered illegal under international law, though Israeli disputes this. The international community considers Israeli settlements to violate the Fourth Geneva Convention's prohibition on the transfer of an occupying power's civilian population into occupied territory. Israel disputes that the Fourth Geneva Convention applies to the Palestinian territories as they had not been legally held by a sovereign prior to Israel taking control of them. This view has been rejected by the International Court of Justice and the International Committee of the Red Cross.

== Notable residents ==
- Rabbi Menachem Froman (1945-2013), rabbi and peace activist
- Dr. Stephen Wiesner (1942-2021), physicist whose proposals launched the field of quantum information theory, including quantum money (which led to quantum key distribution), quantum multiplexing (the earliest example of oblivious transfer) and superdense coding
- Marc Zell (1953-), lawyer.
