= Tuqu' =

Municipality in Bethlehem Governorate, Palestine

- Municipality type C

Arabic transcription(s)
  - Arabic: تقوع
  - Latin: Taqua (official); Teqoa (historical site)
- A sketch of "Tekoa - Fureidis, Palestine"

- Location of Teqoa within Palestine
- Coordinates: 31°38′11″N 35°12′52″E
- Palestine grid: 170/115
- State: State of Palestine
- Governorate: Bethlehem

Government
  - Type: Municipality (from 1997)
  - Head of Municipality: Khaled Ahmad Hamida

Area (built-up)
  - Total: 0.6 km^{2} (0.23 sq mi)

Population (2017)
  - Total: 11,173 (inclusive of all four localities)
  - Density: 19,000/km^{2} (48,000/sq mi)
- Name meaning: "The ruin of Tekua", or "the place for pitching tents"

Tuquʿ or Tequʿ (Arabic: تقوع) is a Palestinian town in the Bethlehem Governorate, located 12 km (7.5 mi) southeast of Bethlehem in the occupied West Bank. The modern part of the town was built up in 1948 adjacent to Khirbet Tuqu' (khirbet meaning "ruins"), the Arabic name for the ancient biblical site of Tekoa (Hebrew: תְּקוֹעַ, romanized: Təqōaʿ), or Crusader Thecoe. Both the ancient and modern sites are part of the Tuqu' municipal council, which includes two other localities: Khirbet ad-Deir ("ruins of the monastery") and Al-Halqum. As of 2019, the modern center of Tuqu' had a population of 8,767, Khirbet Tuqu' of 131, Al -Halqum of 266, and Khirbet ad-Deir of 2,009.

Tuqu' forms part of a wider village cluster - along with Za'atara, Beit Ta'mir, Hindaza, Nuaman, Ubeidiya, and al-Asakra - that the nomadic pastoralist Ta'amreh tribe of Palestinian Bedouins have lived in and around for more than a millennium, and their history is intimately tied to both ancient and modern Tuqu'/Tekoa. Archaeological finds from Khirbet Teqoa include pottery from Iron Age IIA–IIC, Persian, Hellenistic, and Roman periods, as well as remains of a Byzantine-era church built over a tomb tradition attributed to the biblical prophet Amos, or by another tradition, to Saint Nicholas. The site remained inhabited into the Middle Ages, with the remains of a Crusader fortress, and with villagers later paying taxes on agricultural produce under Ottoman rule that were directed to a waqf.

While Tuqu has a municipal jurisdiction of over 191,262 dunams, the built-up area is small, consisting of only 590 dunams, and 98.5% of the village's land was classified as Area C and 1.5% as Area B in the 1995 accords. The Israeli settlement of Tekoa, initially established in 1975 as a Nahal military outpost, was built on 1071 dunams of land which, according to ARIJ, Israel confiscated from the Palestinian citizens of Tuqu'. Israeli settlements in the occupied West Bank, including East Jerusalem, are illegal under international law.

== Etymology ==
Strong's Concordance states that Tekoa means in Hebrew "a stockade". Gesenius' lexicon uses "the pitching" in reference to tents. Horatio Balch Hackett gives the root תקע, meaning "to strike", and like Gensenius connects this to driving of tent pegs into the ground, noting the area's ongoing traditional nomadic pastoralist way at the time of his visit in 1852.

== Location ==
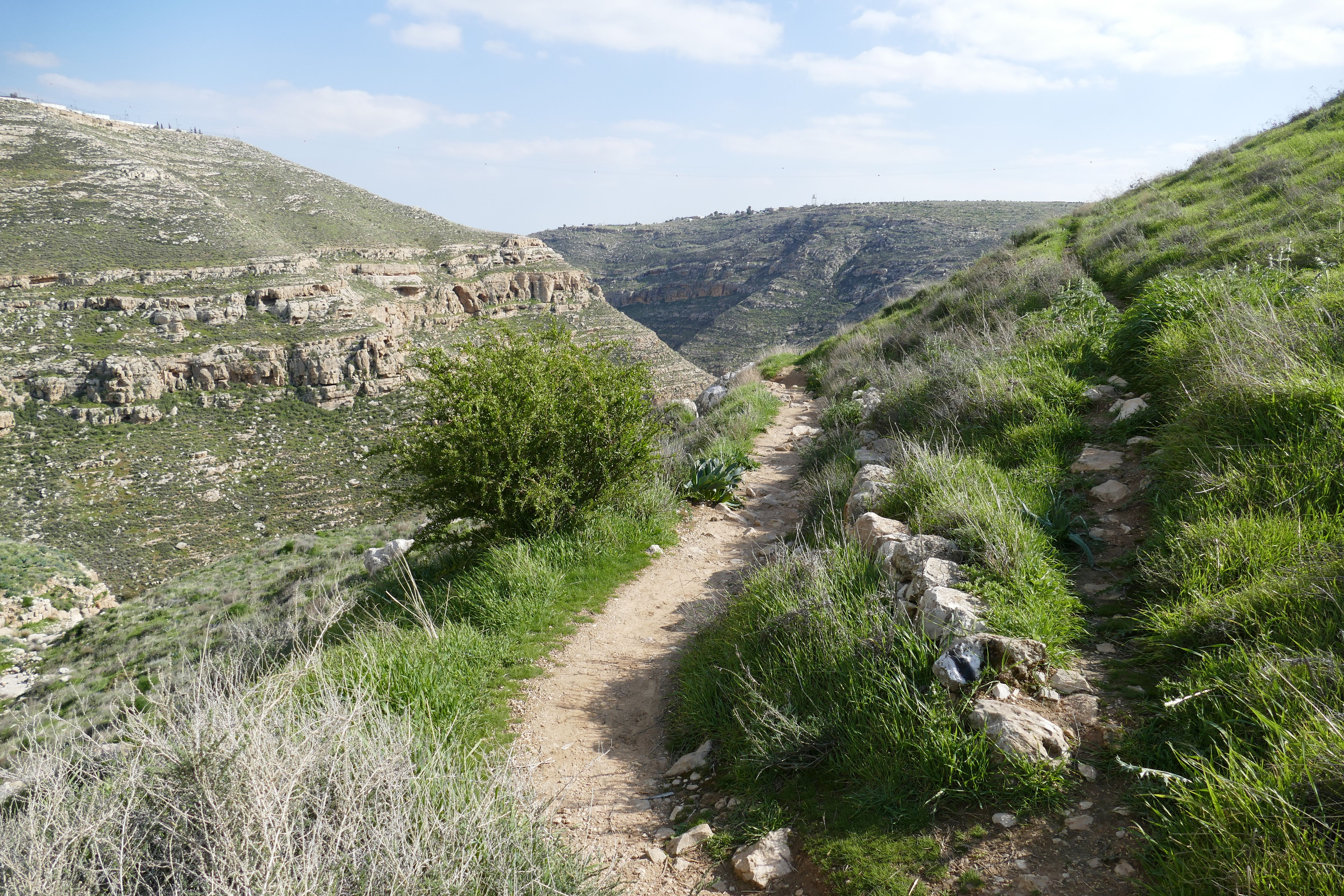
Terrain near ancient Tekoa: the Nahal Tekoa/Wadi Khureitun riverbed in early spring

Tekoa is situated on the eastern edge of the Judean hills, between a broad fertile plain to the west and the desert that bears its name, the Wilderness of Tekoa, to the east. Situated about 16 km south of Jerusalem, it is historically connected by roads leading to Jerusalem, Hebron, and Ein Gedi. From the site, there are extensive views encompassing the fortress of Herodium, Bethlehem, Jericho, Mar Elias, the Judaean Desert, and the Mountains of Moab across the Jordan Valley in Transjordan.

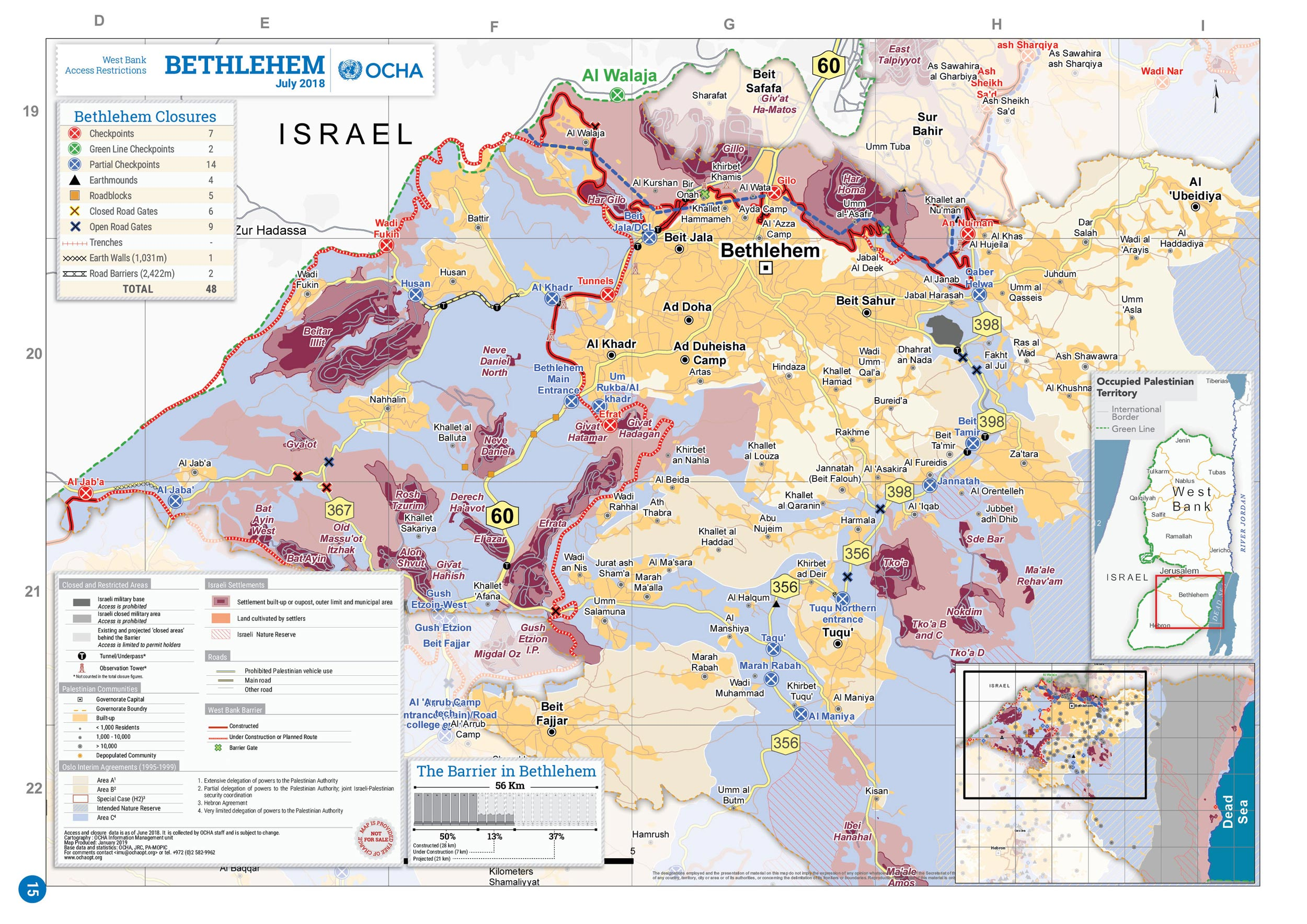
Map of the Bethlehem area of the West Bank, showing Tuqu', Khirbet Tuqu', Al-Halqum and Khirbet ad-Deir. Areas in blue are considered Area C under the Oslo Accords, areas in yellow are inhabited by Palestinians, areas in dark red are built up areas of Israeli settlements and in light red agricultural areas

Both modern and ancient Tekoa, the latter known in Arabic as Khirbet et-Tuqu', are also located 12 km (horizontal distance) or c. 5 miles (8 km) south of Bethlehem. Khirbet ad-Deir is just to the north of modern Tuqu', with al-Halqom lying to its east. Khirbet Tuqu' lies directly to the southeast of modern Tuqu', between the two small Palestinian villages of Al Maniya (which is directly south of modern Tuqu') and Wadi Muhammed, which lies to the west. Also to the west, north of Wadi Muhammed, are Al Manshiya and Marah Rabah. To the north of Tuqu' is Haramala, a small village that is part of the Jannatah municipal council. Israeli settlements are encroaching from the south, overtaking Kisan, Palestine next to Tuqu', and from the east in what is known as the Teqoa wilds, where a series of settlements, broadly called Tekoa (Israeli settlement) continue to be developed.

=== Biblical references ===
The location of biblical Teqoa is elaborately described in Scripture. In the Jewish Encyclopedia (1901), Isidore Singer notes that "the Greek text of a passage (Joshua 15:59) lost in the Hebrew [i.e., in the Masoretic Text (Joshua 15:60)] places it, together with Bethlehem and other towns of the hill-country of Judah, south of Jerusalem". Singer offers as secure the identification of the site at "Khirbat Taḳu'ah". Jeremiah places Teqoa in the south (Jeremiah 6:1), and two other passages speak about the desert, or wilderness, of Tekoa (2 Chronicles 20:20 and 1 Maccabees 9:33).

Tekoa is also identified as the hometown of the prophet Amos, a local herdsman who prophesied in the Kingdom of Israel (Samaria), and Amos 1:1 describes the prophet as "a herdsman of Tekoa". Gary Rendsburg notes the Teqoaʿ mentioned in this passage is referencing another village of the same name that is located somewhere in the Galilee.

According to the biblical narrative, the town belonged to the clan of Caleb. In the Septuagint version of the Book of Joshua, in a passage absent from the Masoretic Text, Tekoa is listed alongside Bethlehem and other nearby localities as part of the territory allotted to the Tribe of Judah. Samuel speaks of a "wise woman" of Tekoa in the time of David (2 Samuel 14:2). King Rehoboam fortified the city and made it strategically important (2 Chronicles 11:6).

== History ==
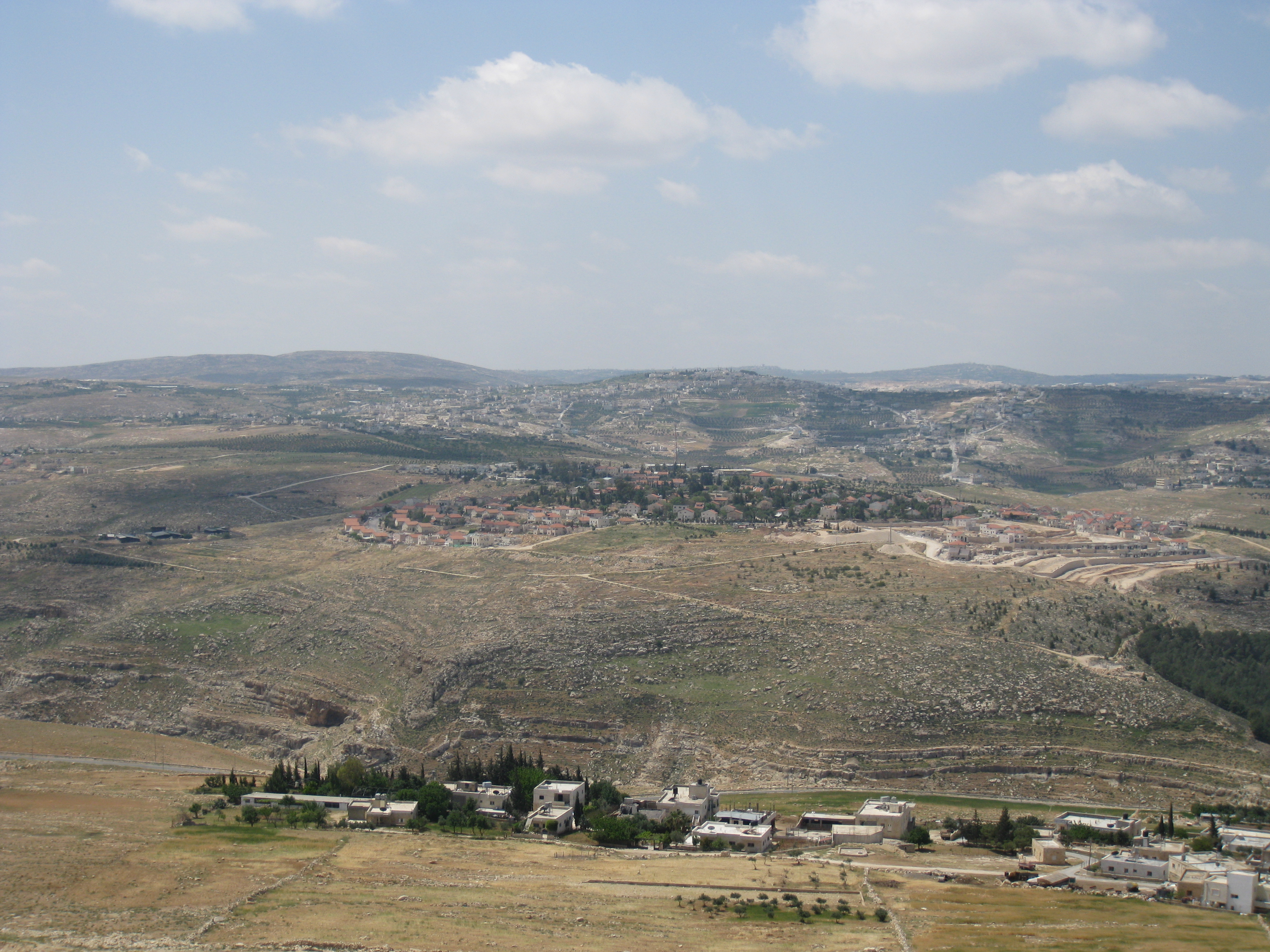
General view of the vicinity. The Israeli settlement of Tekoa is situated at center, while Teqoa is seen directly behind to the left of the settlement, and to its right is the village of Khirbet al-Deir, part of the Teqoa municipality. The village of Al 'Iqab, part of the Jannatah municipality, is in the foreground.

Modern Tuqu' is located immediately west of Khirbet Tuqu' (also spelled Khirbet al-Tuq'u), a still inhabited ancient site with ruins of what is identified as biblical Teqoa, also mentioned by other sources in Classical antiquity.

=== Iron Age ===
Tekoa was extensively inhabited during the Iron Age, and appears to have gained prominence during the rise of Judah in the 10th century BC. A royal stamped jar handle (LMLK seal) dating to the late 8th century BCE was discovered at Tekoa, bearing the inscription "LMLK" ("belonging to the king") and indicating the site's inclusion in the administrative network of Judah established during preparations for the Assyrian invasion. Following the Babylonian conquest and the fall of Judah in the 6th century BC, the Tekoa region became largely depopulated.

=== Persian period 6th - 4th BC ===
Archaeological evidence from this era is scant, though small finds of Persian-period pottery have been reported at the site, suggesting a modest presence. During this period, the surrounding area saw renewed settlement activity, with communities shifting westward toward areas near the watershed where water and agricultural conditions were more favorable.

=== Hellenistic and Roman periods ===
Josephus may have mentioned Teqoa being fortified by Bacchides along with other towns during the Maccabean revolt, (Note: However, an earlier list of Bacchides's fortifications in Judea mentions an unidentified Tepo(n) instead of Tekoa. Some scholars regard this as a corruption of Tekoa following Josephus, while others identify it with different sites, such as Beth-Nethopha,) and again in connection with the First Jewish–Roman War (Life 420, War IV, 518). when describing the movements of rebel and Roman forces in Judaea. The site's proximity to Herodium (Herod the Great's fortress and tomb, only a few kilometers away) may have given Tekoa some significance. Josephus writes that Simon bar Giora, a leader of one of the Jewish factions during the revolt, camped in Tekoa while attempting to capture Herodium.

In his autobiographical work The Life of Flavius Josephus, Josephus also recounts that, on his way to Tekoa, to which he had been sent by Titus together with the Roman commander Sextus Vettulenus Cerialis to see whether it was a suitable place for encamping, he recognized three men among those being crucified. After appealing to Titus, he was permitted to have them taken down from their crosses; two of the men later died, while the third survived.

The surrounding region also saw military activity during the Bar Kokhba revolt, a major Jewish uprising against Roman rule that led to the widespread destruction and depopulation of Judea. Tekoa is mentioned in several documents from this period, including letters written by Simon bar Kokhba, the leader of the revolt. In these, Bar Kokhba rebukes his commanders at Ein Gedi for sheltering men from Tekoa who had evaded conscription, ordering: "Any Tekoan man who is found with you, let the house they reside in be burned," and further instructing, "Any person from Tekoa, or from other places, who is with you—you are to send them to me immediately". It is also possible that some of Tekoa's inhabitants sought refuge in caves along the cliffs of Wadi Khureitun (Naḥal Tekoa), a nearby ravine associated with habitation during the revolt, that would also serve as a refuge in later periods.

=== Late Roman and Byzantine period (4th - 7th century CE ===
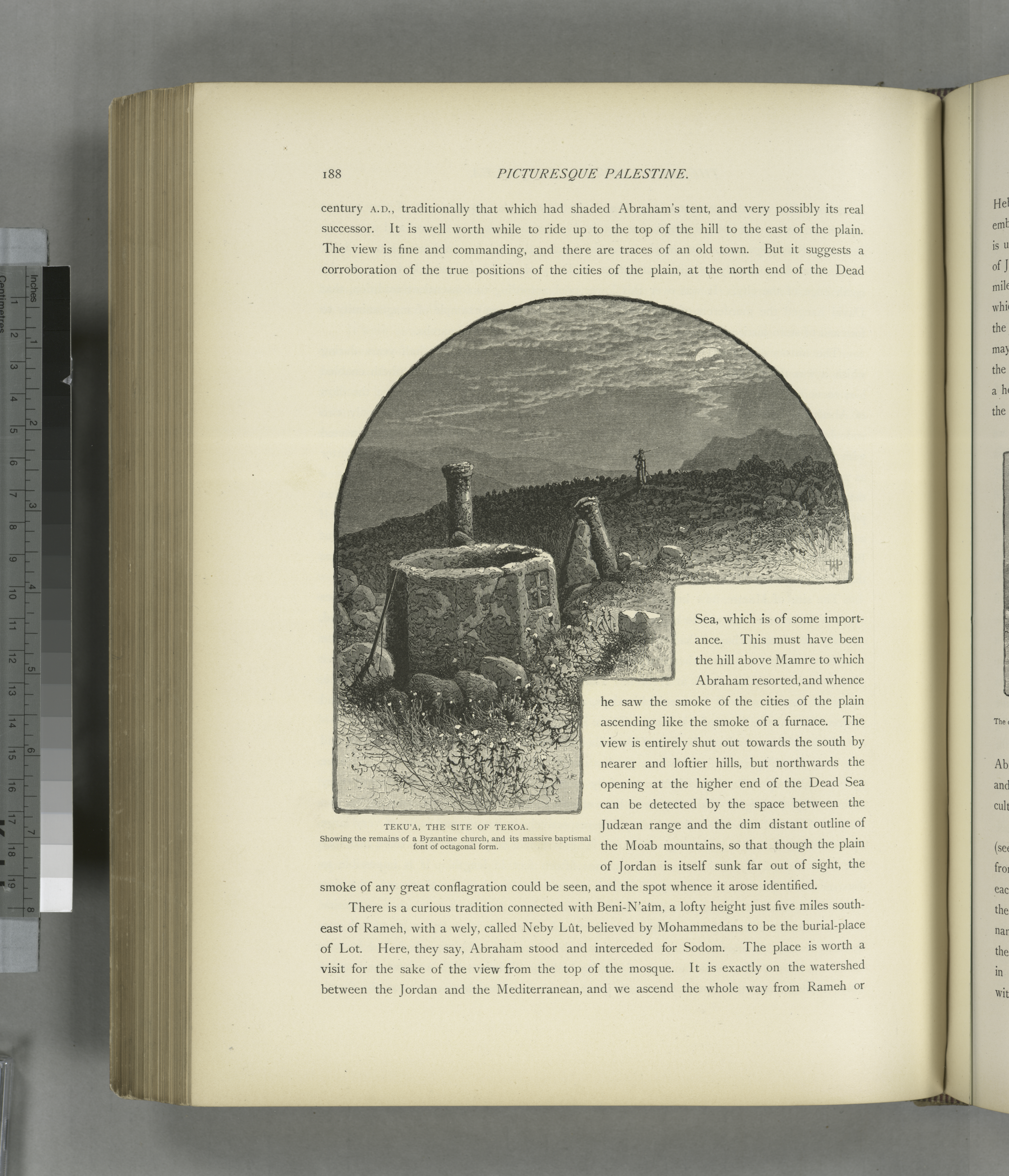
An illustration from 1881 of the baptismal font

Eusebius, one of the Great Church fathers, (c. 260s-340) mentions a village by the name of Teqoa in his Onomasticon 98:17, etc.). Tekoa flourished as a Christian village in the Byzantine period (4th–7th century CE), mentioned in Byzantine sources. The Bible indicates (another) Teqoa as the birthplace of prophet Amos, and a tradition beginning in the 4th century CE holds that there is a tomb in the village belonged to him, though Franciscans say it was a tomb for Saint Nicholas. By the 6th century, a chapel was built over the tomb, as reported by Cyril of Scythopolis. The English bishop Willibald visited the town in 724/725, and his biographer Huneberc recorded the existence of a church containing the tomb of the prophet Amos, and further associated Tekoa with Herod's Massacre of the Innocents.

=== Muslim conquest and Early Muslim period ===
Following the Muslim conquest of Syria, several of the inhabitants were Islamized with time. There was also a significant nomadic Bedouin presence in the village's vicinity who were in an ongoing process of sedenterization, or practicing nomadic pastoralism with intermittent settlement. This was true of the period prior to the Muslim conquest as well, with Arab Bedouins being both responsible for a deadly raid against monks near Teqoa in the early fifth century, but also some of this population becoming sedenterized and Christianized and taking up residence in villages like Teqoa. Long before the Frankish period, the population of Teqoa therefore counted many local Muslims, as well as Christians, among its inhabitants.

=== Crusader and Ayyubid period ===
Teqoa was known as "Casal Techue" by the Crusaders who conquered Palestine in 1099. Its Christian residents welcomed the Crusaders. Medieval chronicler William of Tyre relates that the Christians of the village aided the Crusaders during the Siege of Jerusalem in 1099, by guiding them to local springs and food sources. Many of the villagers also joined the Crusader army.

In 1108, the Russian traveller Abbot Daniel noted that Casal Techue was "a very big village" with a mixed Christian and Muslim population. The village was granted by King Fulk and Queen Melisende to the canons of the Holy Sepulchre in 1138 in exchange for Bethany, the concession allowing the inhabitants to collect bitumen and 'salt' from the Dead Sea shores. The area's population included villeins comprising local Christians and Muslims, the latter being Islamised former Christians, and apparently also recent Frankish (West European) settlers, with Bedouin living outside the village.

The ruins of a quadrangular castle, or Frankish manor house from the period, are found at Khirbat at-Teqoa at the edge of the biblical and Byzantine archaeological mound, some 41x48x60 m in size, and protected by a rock-cut ditch. The structure measured approximately 41 × 48 × 60 × 59 meters, with walls over 2 meters thick and more than 3.5 meters high, and a rock-cut ditch on the northern side.

During the period of Crusader rule, the traditions associating Tekoa with the prophet Amos and the Massacre of Innocents continued, and a new tradition around another biblical figure, the prophet Habakkuk, emerged. It held that Tekoa was one of the places from which Habakkuk was transported to Daniel in Babylon. A church dedicated to Habakkuk was built on the outskirts of the village. In 1106/8, the Russian abbot Daniel visited Tekoa, approaching it from the church of Habbakuk, and described it as a "very large village" inhabited by Christians and Saracens. After spending the night there, he traveled to nearby Bethlehem, escorted by the local chief for protection against Saracen raiders who attacked Christians.

Zengid forces captured Casal Techue in 1138. The Knights Templar under Robert the Burgundian managed to recapture the town easily, but experienced their first military defeat when Zengid forces counterattacked, leaving the area between the town and Hebron "strewn with Templar bodies" according to William of Tyre. The inhabitants who did not flee to the nearby "cave of Odolla" were massacred. He blamed the Templars' defeat on their failure to pursue fleeing Muslim forces which allowed them to regroup just outside Casal Techue.

The Syrian Yaqut al-Hamawi, who visited the area in 1225, described Tekoa as "a village renowned for its honey," during Ayyubid rule.

=== Mamluk period ===
Ayyubid Syria became part of the Mamluk Sultanate in 1260. In 1283, Philip of Savona mentioned the burial cave of the prophet Amos, over which a church stood in his time, adding that the site was also believed to contain the graves of the Massacre of the Innocents. Peter de Pennis, who visited in the mid-14th century, likewise referred to a burial cave of Amos associated with a church.

Tuqu was mentioned in a legal document from Jerusalem dated to 1394 wherein a resident of the village, Nusayr ibn Nasrallah ibn Muhammad, lodged a complaint that he was assaulted by other residents of the village, whom he identified as Christians.

=== Ottoman period ===
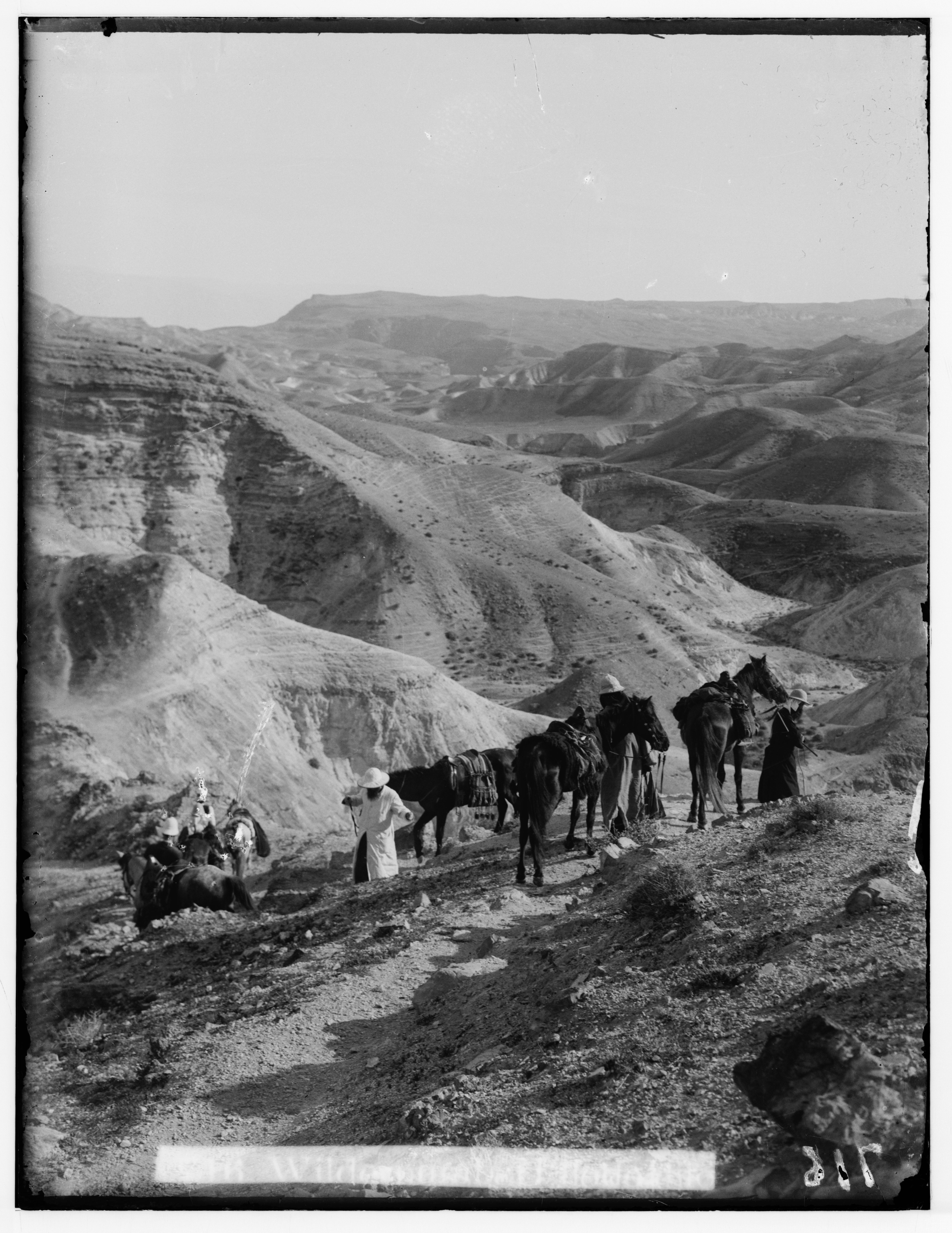
Western travellers in the Wilderness of Tekoa (1900)

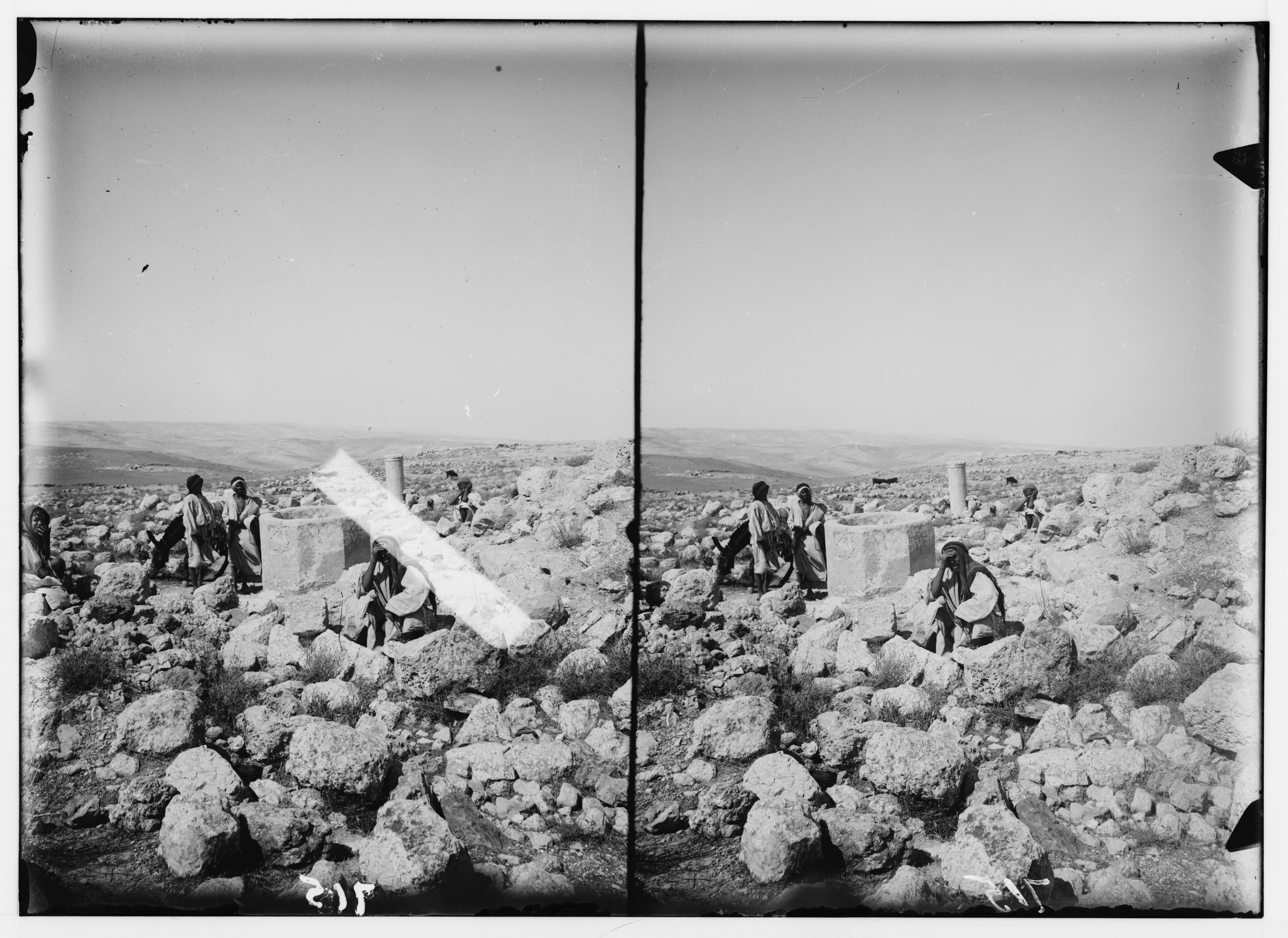
By the baptismal font in Tekoa (1900)

Teqoa, like all of Palestine, was incorporated into the Ottoman Empire in 1517. According to an Ottoman census in 1526, 82 families lived in the village, 55 of which were Christians. In 1596 the village appeared in Ottoman tax registers as being in the nahiya of Mīr within Quds (Jerusalem Sanjak). It had 62 Muslim households and five Christian households. The villagers paid taxes on wheat, barley, olives, vines or fruit trees, and goats or beehives, amounting to 27,000 akçe. All of the revenue went to a waqf.

In 1661, Father Eugène Roger, a French Franciscan missionary, reported that the Church had been damaged and was being used as a small mosque. About eighteen years later, the Jesuit Father Nau recorded the testimony of a local villager, who said that the church was dedicated to Saint Nicholas and that Greek Orthodox priests had officiated there within his lifetime. During his visit, the English traveler Edward Pococke was shown the remains of a castle, which locals regarded as those of an ancient church. Pococke, however, thought the church had stood nearer the center of the hill, where he observed an octagonal marble font and fragments of marble

The majority of Teqoa's Arab Christians emigrated to Bethlehem in the 18th century. Teqoa's Christian migrants formed Bethlehem's Qawawsa Quarter. During the travels of Edward Robinson in Palestine in 1838, his guides and guards in the Bethlehem area and on his way to Teqoa were members of the Ta'amireh tribe. He recounts how they set up his tent by their encampment, and that their traditional roaming grounds extended throughout the area of Bethlehem and Teqoa all the way to the Dead Sea. They guided and accompanied him on his trip Teqoa, which Robinson said was in ruins and deserted, except for these Arabs in the vicinity.

French explorer Victor Guérin visited the site in 1863 noting there were a few families living in caves there. He also provided detailed descriptions of the remains of an almost completely destroyed church, and octagonal baptismal font, carved into a monolithic block of reddish limestone, measuring a meter and ten centimeters deep inside, and one meter thirty centimeters in diameter. On different sides of the octagon crosses were carved. At the bottom of the baptismal font the water flowed through an opening into a tank. The Survey of Western Palestine, with data collected between 1872 and 1877, refers again to the font: "There is also a very fine octagonal font about 4 feet high and 4 feet 3 inches diameter of inscribed circle; on every other side is a design. Two of these designs represent crosses, a third is a wreath, the fourth is formed by two squares interlaced diagonally to one another. The font is of good reddish stone."

The PEF Survey of Palestine in 1883 mentions that it "seems to have been large and important in Christian times. It is still inhabited by a few persons living in the caves [...]" The Ta'amireh were living in the caves of Teqoa at this time. Charles William Wilson, the British Army officer who carried out surveys of the area of Jerusalem described the Ta'amireh dwelling in tents in and around Teqoa at the time as the "modern successors" of its ancient inhabitants, noting that biblical Amos was called "the herdsman of Tekoa" and "gatherer of wild figs".

Horatio Balch Hackett, who visited the village during his travels in Palestine in 1852, describes the pastoralist history of the site that he sees reflected and come to life in the two large shepherds' encampments he found there, with their varied herds of horses, cattle, goats, camels, sheep and goats, all around them and up the hillsides as far as the eye could see. He also describes the water source on the outskirts of the village as a spring bustling with activity, with women and men collecting drinking water for their families and their herds. John Mee Fuller described the same scenes with black-goat skinned tents and intense mixed gender activity around the spring, during his visit there towards the end of the 19th century.

=== Jordanian period ===
The modern town of Teqoa was established right next to the ancient village site in 1948 during Jordanian rule, as part of a sedentarization process that began in the 1920s and was largely completed by the 1970s. The inhabitants were Bedouins from the Ta'amireh tribe, whose nomadic pastoralist way of life had long included intermittent settlement in ancient Teqoa and the wider area around Bethlehem and Jerusalem.

=== Post-1967 ===
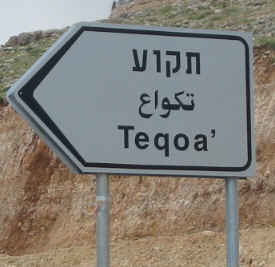
Street sign

During the Six-Day War in 1967, Teqoa came under Israeli occupation, remaining so until this day. The population in the 1967 census conducted by the Israeli authorities was 1,362.

Over the years, Israel has confiscated 1,436 dunams of Teqoa's land for the construction of three Israeli settlements: Tekoa, Mitzpe Shalem, and a resort, Metzoke Dragot. In addition, the settlers have constructed various outposts. Palestinian movement, the building of water wells to maintain agricultural lands, and the repair of old roads connecting the various parts of the municipality are severely constrained by the Israeli occupation authorities who deny travel and building permits, issue stop work orders or demolish even EU funded projects, often based on settler protests.

In May 2001, after the killing of two Jewish Israeli boys outside the nearby Israeli settlement of Tekoa, Teqoa was temporarily sealed off by the Israeli Army. Consequently, residents could not reach their jobs in Bethlehem and Israel, and shepherds could not reach grazing lands outside the village.

On 15 December 2025, Israeli forces fatally shot a Palestinian minor during a military raid in the town of Tuqu’ (Bethlehem Governorate). During the operation, soldiers used live fire as well as stun grenades and tear gas, while Palestinians in the area reportedly responded by throwing stones. The following day, a Palestinian youth was shot dead by an Israeli settler near the northern entrance to Tuqu’. The shooting occurred shortly after the funeral of the child who had been killed by Israeli forces during the raid the previous day.

== Demographics ==
According to a 1997 census by the Palestinian Central Bureau of Statistics (PCBS), Teqoa had a population of 4,890 inhabitants. There were only 24 Palestinian refugees, making up 0.5% of the population. There were 2,534 males and 2,356 females. Tuqu's population grew to 8,881 in the 2007 PCBS census. There were 1,368 households, with the average household size consisting of between six and seven members. The gender ratio was 49% women and 51% men.

Teqoa has a Muslim majority and there are ten mosques in the town. They are the following: Abu Bakr as-Siddik Mosque, Bilal Ibn Rabah Mosque, al-Sahaba Mosque, al-Tawba Mosque, Abd al-Rahman Ibn 'Oof Mosque, Zaid Ibn Haritha Mosque, al-Abbas Mosque and Salah ad-Deen Mosque, al-Ansar Mosque and Ali Ibn Abi Talib Mosque. Most of the inhabitants belong to the 'Arab al-Ta'amira tribe. Principal clans include Badan, Jibreen, Sha'er, 'Emur, Nawawra, 'Urooj, Abu Mifrih, az-Zawahra, Sbeih, at-Tnooh, Sleiman and Sabbah.

Tuqu' is one of the villages of the Ta'amra tribe. There are people who trace their origins to Tuqu' that now live in Tarqumiyah.

== Economy ==
Agriculture, particularly livestock, dominates Teqoa's economy. Dairy is produced and sold in local markets and in Bethlehem. Industry is virtually nonexistent, although there is a stone quarry and brick factory in the town. Unemployment is high at about 50% and mostly caused by Israeli restrictions on movement and access to the labor market in Israel proper as a result of the Second Intifada between 2000 and 2004.

As of 2008 around 45% of Teqoa's workforce was employed in the Israeli labor market while another 30% worked in agriculture. The remainder of economic activity was split between employment in the Palestinian government or trade and services. Efforts have been made to attract tourists. A municipal center was built near the ruins of a Byzantine church in Teqoa. Tuqu' is well known for its vegetables.

== Government ==
Since 1995, 98.5% of Tuqu's land area has been located in Area C or nature reserves, thereby depriving the Palestinian Authority of control over its administration and civil affairs. Originally, twelve tribal elders managed the town, but unable to plan and carry out internal improvements, they ceded their power to a council of younger men. The 13-member municipal council was established in 1997 to administer Tuqu' as well as the villages of Khirbet al-Deir, al-Halqum, and Khirbet Tuqu'ʿ, which were put under Tuqu's jurisdiction. Its first mayor, Suleiman Abu Mufarreh, initiated the construction of the municipal hall and recovered Tuqūʿ's stolen baptismal font, relocating it to the front of the municipal hall.

Tuqu' is governed by a municipal council of eleven members, including the mayor. In the 2004–05 Palestinian local elections, the Hamas-backed Reform list won the majority of the seats (eight), while the independent local United Tuqu' list won three. Reform member Khaled Ahmad Hamida won the mayorship, succeeding Raed Hamida.

== Archaeology of Khirbet Tuqu' (ancient Teqoa) ==
The main periods of habitation brought to light by archaeological digs at Khirbet Teqoa are the Iron Age II, and the Byzantine period. Less well represented are the Iron Age IIb, Persian, Early and Late Roman, and medieval (Crusader to Mamluk) periods. Various ruins were seen at the site in the mid-19th century. These included the walls of houses, cisterns, broken columns and heaps of building stones, some of which had "bevelled edges" which supposedly indicated ancient Jewish origin. The site (Grid Ref. 170100/115600), has been excavated by Martin Heicksen (1968), John J. Davis (1970), and Sayf al-Din Haddad (1981).

=== Byzantine church ===
The remains of the large Byzantine church were explored in the northern part of archaeological site during a 1968 survey and partial excavation. The structure, measuring about 25 by 17 meters, was basilical in plan and likely formed part of a monastic complex. Its prayer hall featured a rectangular external apse, a nave flanked by two aisles separated by rows of columns and pilasters, and an entrance in the southern wall.

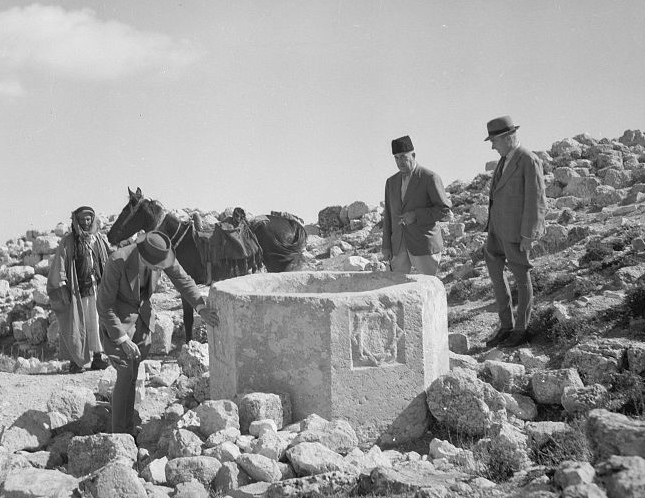
The octagonal baptismal font at Tekoa, photographed in 1940. This carved stone basin was part of the Byzantine church complex built at the site, described by Guérin in 1863, photographed in 1940

A mosaic floor and various architectural fragments, including columns, capitals, and square bases, were documented. North of the church lay an open courtyard with several cisterns, while adjoining rooms extended to the west and south. An octagonal baptismal font decorated with crosses and rosettes was also found nearby, and some architectural elements from the church were later reused in the adjacent Crusader fortress.

A small apsidal chapel, about 11×6 meters in size and oriented to the east, was found south of the main church near the center of the site. It was enclosed within a walled area roughly 20×17 meters across.

Since none of the excavated Byzantine structures were found in association with a burial cave as described in medieval accounts linking the Church to Amos, scholars believe that the true location of Amos' tomb may lie elsewhere. A third structure, possibly from medieval times, with a pointed barrel vault leading to a burial cave on the northeast side of the hill has yet to be thoroughly investigated or excavated. These ruins consist of a double cave over what was a baptismal font, mosaic floors; a Monophysite monastery is located near the tomb. Byzantine ceramics have been found.

The baptismal font was seized by Israeli soldiers in 2020 from outside the Mayor's house where it was being temporarily displayed until a museum could be constructed to showcase it.

=== Burial caves ===
A rock-cut tomb (Tomb 302), located on the southwestern slope of the site and considered typical of late Iron Age II clan/family tombs in Judah, was excavated in 1968 and 1970 by J. J. Davis. The tomb consists of a single rectangular chamber (about 7.7 × 2.8 m) with an entrance cut into the western face of the rock. Along the chamber walls, eight burial loculi were hewn, what is in fact an unusually high number for Iron Age tombs in Judah. Each loculus contained a circular repository carved into the back wall. Finds from the tomb included ceramic bowls, jars, jugs, cooking pots, oil lamps, and small vessels, as well as iron implements, a bronze spatula, a terracotta figurine, and a bone object shaped like an animal. Human remains were also recovered, some showing signs of arthritis and other pathologies. The assemblage dates the tomb to the late 8th to early 6th century BCE, with secondary use during the Herodian or Roman period.

Additional rock-cut tombs are located on the western slope of the site, about 300 meters northwest of the ruin. Five such tombs were recorded there, some attributed to the Iron Age and others reused during the Roman or Herodian periods. Their architecture is only partially documented, but finds attributed to these tombs include Iron Age II pottery of the 8th–7th centuries BCE, consisting mainly of bowls, decanters, cooking pots, juglets, and lamps typical of Judahite assemblages of that era. Several of these vessels are housed in the Studium Biblicum Franciscanum Museum in Jerusalem and the Harvard Museum of the Ancient Near East in Cambridge, Massachusetts.

Several burial caves discovered near the Byzantine complex contained Byzantine era oil lamps decorated with cross motifs and inscriptions.

=== Amulet ===
A magical amulet etched on a silver plate and written in Aramaic, said to be from Tekoa, is among the findings from the Byzantine period. The amulet contains 16 lines, 11 of which use Hebrew script; the others show magic characters. It dates to the fifth to seventh centuries CE, and is currently located in the SBF Museum, Jerusalem.

== Other archaeological sites and landmarks ==
The site of Khirbet Teqoa is considered "qualified in terms of tourism". A second archaeological site near Teqoa, Khirbet Umm El 'Amd, is "not qualified" in terms of tourism.

The New Lavra of Saint Sabbas (est. 507 by Sabbas the Sanctified) is today in ruins at the site of Bir el-Wa'ar, midway between Tuqu' and Bethlehem.

=== Paleolithic caves in Wadi Khureitun ===
Outside Teqoa, adjacent to the Israeli settlement of Tuqūʿ is Wadi Khureitun, sometimes spelled Khreiton ("Chariton Valley"). The valley is notable for containing three prominent caves inhabited since the Paleolithic: Umm Qatfa, Umm Qala'a and Erq al-Ahmar. The latter was inhabited since 8,000 BCE, and traces of fire have been found in Umm Qala'a, dating back 500,000 years.

== Bibliography ==
- Avi-Yonah, M. (1976). "Gazetteer of Roman Palestine". Qedem. 5: 3–112. ISSN 0333-5844. JSTOR 43587090.
- Conder, C.R.; Kitchener, H.H. (1883). The Survey of Western Palestine: Memoirs of the Topography, Orography, Hydrography, and Archaeology. Vol. 3. London: Committee of the Palestine Exploration Fund.
- Cotton, Hannah; Lupu, Eran; Heimbach, Marfa; Schneider, Naomi, eds. (2018). Iudaea / Idumaea. Corpus inscriptionum Iudaeae/Palaestinae: a multi-lingual corpus of the inscriptions from Alexander to Muhammad. Vol. IV. Berlin: De Gruyter. pp. 823–825. ISBN 978-3-11-022219-7. OCLC 663773367.
- Dauphin, C. (1998). La Palestine byzantine, Peuplement et Populations. BAR International Series 726 (in French). Vol. III : Catalogue. Oxford: Archeopress. ISBN 0-860549-05-4.
- Dever, W. G. (2017). Beyond the Texts: An Archaeological Portrait of Ancient Israel and Judah. SBL Press. ISBN 978-0-88414-217-1.
- Ellenblum, R. (2003). Frankish Rural Settlement in the Latin Kingdom of Jerusalem. Cambridge University Press. ISBN 0521521874.
- Fuller, J.M. (1893). A Dictionary of the Bible: Comprising Its Antiquities, Biography, Geography, and Natural History (in three volumes).
- Government of Jordan, Department of Statistics (1964). First Census of Population and Housing. Volume I: Final Tables; General Characteristics of the Population (PDF).
- Grossman, David (1992). Rural Process-Pattern Relationships: Nomadization, Sedentarization, and Settlement Fixation. Bloomsbury Academic. ISBN 978-0-275-94084-3.
- Guérin, V. (1869). Description Géographique Historique et Archéologique de la Palestine (in French). Vol. 1: Judee, pt. 3. Paris: L'Imprimerie Nationale.
- Hütteroth, W.-D.; Abdulfattah, K. (1977). Historical Geography of Palestine, Transjordan and Southern Syria in the Late 16th Century. Erlanger Geographische Arbeiten, Sonderband 5. Erlangen, Germany: Vorstand der Fränkischen Geographischen Gesellschaft. ISBN 3-920405-41-2.
- Isaac, B.H. (2018), The Near East Under Roman Rule, Selected Papers, Brill, ISBN 978-90-04-35153-0
- Kallai, Zecharia (1986). Historical Geography of the Bible: The Tribal Territories of Israel. Brill. doi:10.1163/9789004677142_030. ISBN 978-90-04-67714-2.
- Kark, R.; Oren-Nordheim, Michal (2001). Jerusalem and its environs : quarters, neighborhoods, villages, 1800-1948. Detroit, Jerusalem: Wayne State University Press; Hebrew Univ. Magnes Press [u.a.] pp. 202, 241, 279ff. ISBN 978-0814329092.
- Le Strange, G. (1890). Palestine Under the Moslems: A Description of Syria and the Holy Land from A.D. 650 to 1500. Committee of the Palestine Exploration Fund.
- Lipschits, O.; Blenkinsopp, J., eds. (2003). "Demographic Changes in Judah between the Seventh and the Fifth Centuries BCE". Judah and the Judeans in the Neo-Babylonian Period. Winona Lake, Indiana: Eisenbrauns. pp. 323–376.
- Magen, Yitzhak; Kagan, Evgeni D.; Tzionit, Yoav; Malka, Ayelet Hashahar; Ben-Lulu, Avia; Peleg, Yuval; Levin, Edward (2012). "Corpus of Christian Sites [165-364]". In Malka, Ayelet Hashahar (ed.). Christians and Christianity, Vol II. Corpus of Christian sites in Judea. Vol. 14 (1 ed.). Israel Antiquities Authority / רשות העתיקות. pp. 1–314. doi:10.2307/j.ctt1x76gt8.5. ISBN 978-965-406-253-4. JSTOR j.ctt1x76gt8.5.
- Mor, Menahem (2016). The Second Jewish Revolt: The Bar Kokhba War, 132–136 CE. Brill. ISBN 978-90-04-31463-4.
- Palmer, E.H. (1881). The Survey of Western Palestine: Arabic and English Name Lists Collected During the Survey by Lieutenants Conder and Kitchener, R. E. Transliterated and Explained by E.H. Palmer. Committee of the Palestine Exploration Fund.
- Pringle, D. (1997). Secular buildings in the Crusader Kingdom of Jerusalem: an archaeological Gazetter. Cambridge University Press. ISBN 0521-46010-7.
- Pringle, D. (1998). The Churches of the Crusader Kingdom of Jerusalem: L-Z (excluding Tyre). Vol. II. Cambridge University Press. ISBN 0-521-39037-0.
- Rapoport, Yossef (2025). Becoming Arab: The Formation of Arab Identity in the Medieval Middle East. Princeton: Princeton University Press. ISBN 9780691210636.
- Raviv, Dvir; Ullman, Micka; Langford, Boaz; Frumkin, Amos; Porat, Roi; Zissu, Boaz (2021). "Finds from the Bar-Kokhba Revolt on the Cliffsides of Wadi Chariton (Naḥal Teqoa)". Israel Exploration Journal. 71 (2): 204–223. ISSN 0021-2059. JSTOR 27194661.
- Robinson, E.; Smith, E. (1841). Biblical Researches in Palestine, Mount Sinai and Arabia Petraea: A Journal of Travels in the year 1838. Vol. 2. Boston: Crocker & Brewster. (pp. 183 ff, Tekoa)
- Rogers, Guy MacLean (2021). For the Freedom of Zion: The Great Revolt of Jews against Romans, 66–74 CE. New Haven and London: Yale University Press. ISBN 978-0-300-24813-5.
- Negev, A.; Gibson, S. (2001). Archaeological Encyclopedia of the Holy Land. New York and London: Continuum. ISBN 0-8264-1316-1.
- Röhricht, R. (1893). (RRH) Regesta regni Hierosolymitani (MXCVII-MCCXCI) (in Latin). Berlin: Libraria Academica Wageriana. (pp. 43-44, no. 174)
- Smith, William (1868). Dr. William Smith's Dictionary of the Bible (Volume 4).
- Thomson, W.M. (1859). The Land and the Book: Or, Biblical Illustrations Drawn from the Manners and Customs, the Scenes and Scenery, of the Holy Land. Vol. 2 (1 ed.). New York: Harper & brothers.
- Wenning, Robert (2021). Materialien zu den eisenzeitlichen Gräbern in Israel/Palästina. Ägypten und Altes Testament (in German). Münster: Zaphon. pp. 292–295. doi:10.2307/jj.18654702. ISBN 978-3-96327-116-8. JSTOR jj.18654702.
- Wilson, C. W. (1881). Picturesque Palestine, Sinai, and Egypt, Volume 2, Part 3.
- Ziv, Yehuda (1982). ""בוקר ובולס-שקמים" — בתקוע?". Beit Mikra: Journal for the Study of the Bible and Its World / בית מקרא: כתב-עת לחקר המקרא ועולמו. כח (א (צ"ב)): 49–53. ISSN 0005-979X. JSTOR 23504394.
