= Basil Hennessy =

Australian archaeologist (1925–2013)

John Basil Hennessy AO (10 February 1925 – 27 October 2013), was an Australian archaeologist of the Ancient Near East and Emeritus Professor of Near Eastern Archaeology at the University of Sydney.

== Childhood, early career and education ==
Born in Horsham, Victoria, Australia in 1925, the eldest child of Thomas Basil Hennessy and Nell Poultney, Hennessy was educated in nearby Ballarat, before leaving school at 17 to join the Royal Australian Navy. Released from military service in 1946, Hennessy enrolled at the University of Sydney in early 1947 with the intention of studying anthropology. In 1948, however, Arthur Dale Trendall and James Stewart founded the University's Department of Archaeology, Hennessy becoming one of their first undergraduates.

== Foreign ventures ==
Graduating with a BA Hons in 1950, Hennessy embarked on a tour throughout the Middle East, finishing at Ankara, capital of Turkey where Hennessy held the inaugural student scholarship at the newly created British School of Archaeology in Ankara.

Hennessy returned to Jerusalem at the end of 1951 in order to join the first season of renewed excavations at Jericho under the direction of Kathleen Kenyon. It was at Jericho that Hennessy was exposed to the Wheeler-Kenyon technique of baulk-debris excavation, a technique he was to employ and adapt widely in his own subsequent excavations.

Returning to Australia via London, Hennessy became engaged to Ruth Shannon. The couple were married in 1954 and subsequently had three children.

1954 also saw Hennessy join the Department of Archaeology at the University of Sydney, initially as a temporary lecturer (1954–55, 1957), then later as a full-time lecturer (1958–61). 1962 saw Hennessy and his young family leave Australia once more, in order that Hennessy might pursue postgraduate study at Oxford University, England. During the period 1962-64, Hennessy studied at Magdalen College, completing his DPhil under the supervision of Kathleen Kenyon. His resulting dissertation, entitled The Foreign Relations of Palestine during the Early Bronze Age, remains one of the early standard works on that period.

== Years in Jerusalem ==
Hennessy's completion of his doctorate coincided with the beginning of an intimate association with the British School of Archaeology in Jerusalem. Appointed Assistant Director of the School in 1965, becoming Deputy Director later the same year, Hennessy achieved the full directorship in 1966, remaining as Director until 1970. During these years, Hennessy directed excavations at the Damascus Gate in the Old City of Jerusalem (1964–66), at the Amman Airport Temple (1966), at Teleilat Ghassul (1967) and at Samaria in 1968.

== Return to Sydney ==
Hennessy left Jerusalem in 1970 because of the outbreak of Arab-Israeli hostilities, taking up the Edwin Cuthbert Hall Visiting Professorship in Near Eastern Archaeology at the University of Sydney. The chair was fully restored in 1973, Hennessy holding the Sydney professorship from that year until his retirement in 1990, when he was replaced by the current chair, Daniel Potts. During his tenure, Hennessy directed Australian excavations at Teleilat Ghassul (1975–77) and, from 1978 at Pella (initially in association with Wooster College, Ohio). Hennessy was also instrumental in founding the Near Eastern Archaeology Foundation at the University of Sydney in 1986.

== Retirement and honours ==
Hennessy was appointed Emeritus Professor of Archaeology after his retirement in 1990 and in 1993 received an Honorary Doctor of Letters from his alma mater, the University of Sydney.

== Publications ==
- Stephania - A Middle and Late Bronze Age Cemetery in Cyprus, 1963.
- The Foreign Relations of Palestine During the Early Bronze Age, 1967.
- Pella in Jordan I (with A.W. McNicoll and R.H. Smith), 1982.
