= Lavra =

Type of monastery consisting of a cluster of cells or caves centered on a church

A lavra or laura (Greek: λαύρα; Cyrillic: ла́вра) is a type of monastery consisting of a cluster of cells or caves for hermits, with a church and sometimes a refectory at the center. Lavra monasteries operate within the Orthodox and other Eastern Christian traditions; the name is also used by some Catholic communities. The term in Greek initially meant a narrow lane or an alley in a city. In a later Eastern Orthodox context, the term took on the new meaning of a large and important monastery.

== History ==
=== Byzantine laura/lavra ===
From the fifth century the Greek term laura could refer specifically to the semi-eremitical monastic settlements of the Judaean Desert, where lauras were very numerous. The first lauras of Palestine were founded by Chariton the Confessor (born 3rd century, died c. 350): the Laura of Pharan (now Wadi Qelt) northeast of Jerusalem, the Laura of Douka on the Mount of Temptation west of Jericho, and Souka Laura or Old Laura in the area of Tuqu' in Wadi Khureitun.

Saint Euthymius the Great (377–473) founded one of the early lauras in fifth-century Palestine. The Lavra of Saint Sabbas the Sanctified (†532) in the Kidron Valley (known in Syriac as Mar Saba), is one of the most ancient and almost continuously functioning monasteries in the Christian Church.

Gerasimus of the Jordan established a similar system in the Jordan Valley in the middle of the fifth century, with 70 cells surrounding a cenobium and with monks progressing into the cells after time spent in the cenobium. Weekdays were spent in the cells, accompanied only by a rush mat, a small amount of food and palm blades with which to make ropes and baskets. On Saturdays the monks would bring their handiwork to the cenobium and receive the Eucharist together, returning to their cells on Sunday evening. Cells were left open, and those in need could take whatever they wished from a cell if it were found empty. The lavra had a priest, the lavra's contact with the outside world, and at least two ordained deacons.

The Great Lavra founded by Athanasius the Athonite in 963 is the oldest monastery on Mount Athos in Greece.

=== Coptic tradition ===
Some modern Coptic authors, and they alone, already apply the specific Greek term lavra to even earlier monastic settlements from the Wadi El Natrun and even attribute the writing down of the formal rules of a lavra to the Egyptian sanctified monk Macarius of Egypt in AD 330. Unless proven otherwise by future scholarship, this opinion seems to be theirs alone.

Their claim is that the lavrite style of living has its origins in the early fourth century, by equating the creation of the first lavras with the founding of a settlement of cells in the Nitrean desert at a site known as Nitria, named for the nearby town of the same name (near Alexandria in Egypt). It was a community of 600 hermits who lived scattered over the area, reliant on the town of Nitria for bread, but with their own priest and church.

=== Kievan Rus' ===
The first lavra in the Kievan Rus' was the Kyiv Pechersk Lavra founded in the 11th century in Kyiv (now in Ukraine). Its founding is mentioned in the 12th-century Primary Chronicle.

== Later meaning ==
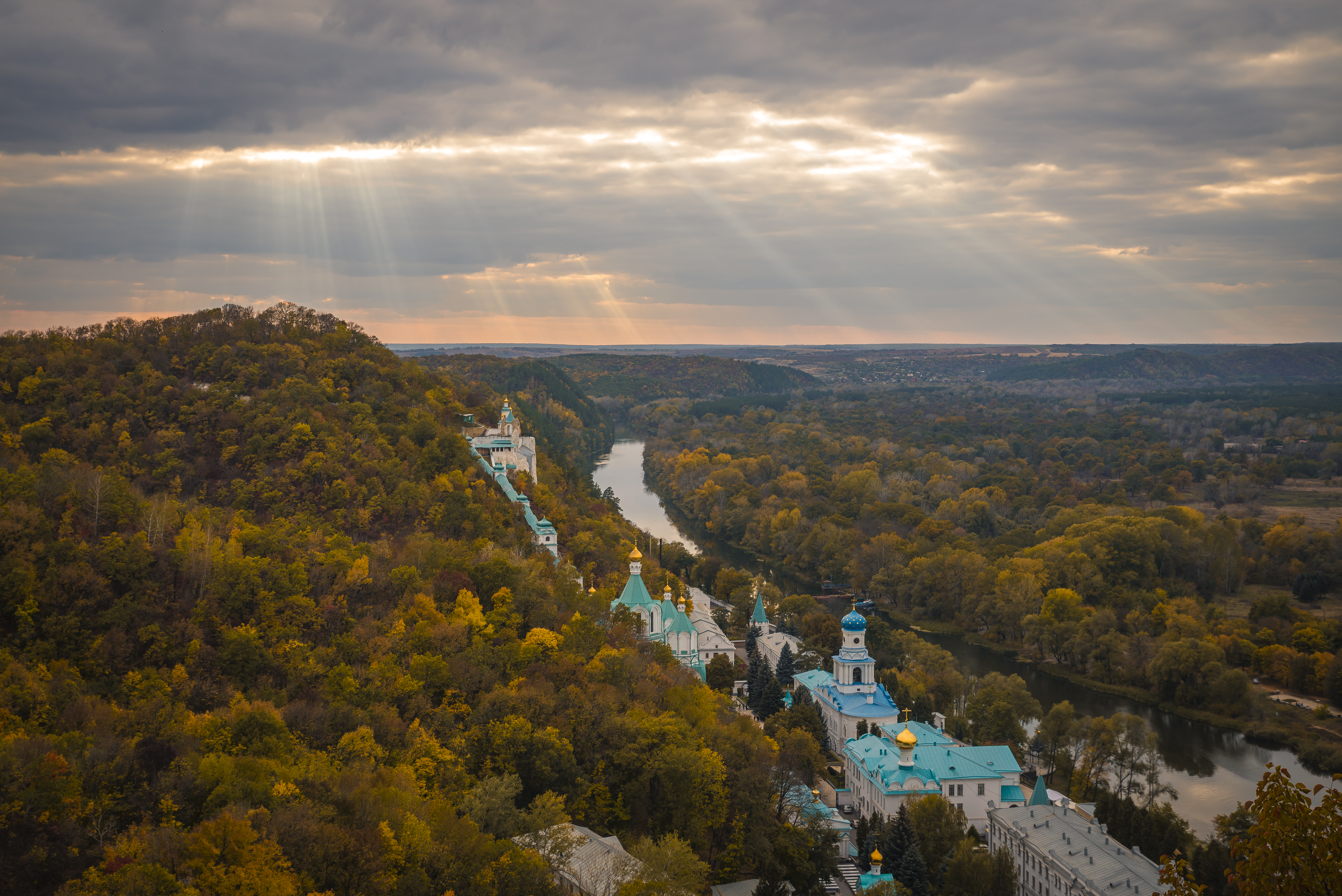
The Holy Mountains Lavra near the city of Sviatohirsk, Ukraine

The largest and the most important Eastern Orthodox monasteries have at some point been called lavras. Those among them which were part of the Russian Orthodox Church have become subordinated directly to the Patriarch of Moscow. In 1721, they became subordinated to the Russian Most Holy Synod.

== Notable examples ==
- Ecumenical Patriarchate of Constantinople:
  - Great Lavra, Mount Athos (10th century):
- Georgian Orthodox Church:
  - David Gareja monastery complex (since 1505)
- Church of Greece:
  - Agia Lavra (since 961)
- Greek Orthodox Church of Jerusalem:
  - Mar Saba (532)
- Polish Orthodox Church:
  - Supraśl Orthodox Monastery (since 1505)
- Romanian Orthodox Church:
  - Neamț Monastery (since 15th century)
- Serbian Orthodox Church:
  - Hilandar (since 1198)
- Russian Orthodox Church:
  - Trinity Lavra of St. Sergius (since 1744)
  - Alexander Nevsky Lavra (since 1797)
- Ukrainian Greek Catholic Church:
  - Pochaiv Lavra (since mid-18th century)
  - Univ Lavra (since 1898)
- Ukrainian Orthodox Church:
  - Kyiv Pechersk Lavra (since 1051)
  - Pochaiv Lavra (since 1833)
  - Sviatohirsk Lavra (since 2004)

== See also ==
- Cenobitic monasticism
- Hermitage
- Skete

== Sources ==
- Parry, Ken; David Melling, eds. (1999). The Blackwell Dictionary of Eastern Christianity. Malden, Mass.: Blackwell Publishing. ISBN 0-631-23203-6.
- Lewin, Ariel (2005). The Archaeology of Ancient Judea and Palestine. Getty Trust Publications. ISBN 0-89236-800-4.
