= Teleilat el-Ghassul =

Archaeological site in Jordan

Coordinates: 31°48′00″N 35°36′00″E

Teleilat el-Ghassul, also spelled Tuleilat el-Ghassul and Tulaylât al-Ghassûl, is the site of several small hillocks (tuleilat, 'small tells') containing the remains of a number of Neolithic and Chalcolithic villages in Jordan. It is the type-site of the Ghassulian culture, which flourished in the Southern Levant during the Middle and Late Chalcolithic period (c. 4400 – c. 3500 BC). It is located in the lower eastern Jordan Valley, opposite and a little to the south of Jericho and 5-6 kilometers northeast of the Dead Sea. Teleilat el-Ghassul was occupied for a relatively long period of time during the Chalcolithic era - 8 successive Chalcolithic phases of occupation were identified there, most of them belonging to the Ghassulian culture.

== Excavations ==
The site was excavated between 1929 and 1938 by Alexis Mallon and Robert Koeppel of the Jesuit Pontifical Biblical Institute's Jerusalem branch, assisted by prehistorian René Neuville. They identified 5 layers of settlement that belonged to the same culture. It was excavated again, between 1959 and 1960, by a Pontifical Biblical Institute (PBI) expedition led by Robert North, S.J. In 1967, in an expedition of The University of Sydney directed by Basil Hennessy, 9 phases of occupation were identified on the site (phases A-I), with an additional phase, A*, that had been lost to erosion. Of these, phases A*-G were dated to the Chalcolithic era and phases H and I - the basal layers - were dated to the Late Neolithic. He also discerned 5 episodes of campfloor occupation, interleaved with those of more substantial architecture. The topmost layer of the site had apparently been eroded by nature and by human activity, and might actually have represented several separate occupation phases. Hennessy conducted excavations on the site again from 1975 to 1977.

Another team from The University of Sydney, led by Stephen J. Bourke, worked on the site between 1994 and 1999. Bourke divided all phases of occupation discovered on the site into 6 archaeological horizons, with horizons 1-5 comprising the Chalcolithic phases and horizon 6 - the Late Neolithic ones.

In February 2026, a study published in the journal Tel Aviv provided the first systematic analysis of Chalcolithic cornets (cone-shaped ceramic vessels). Researchers from Tel Aviv University used 3D scanning and petrographic analysis to examine over 500 fragments, concluding that these vessels likely served as ritual lamps.

== Late-Neolithic architecture ==
The earlier, Late Neolithic settlers, built semi-subterranean, ovoid houses, that contained a single room. Most of one such housing unit was excavated by Hennessy, suggesting its dimensions were around 4 x 2.5 meters. The lower parts of the walls were made of pisé, with upperworks of less permanent materials. Also, exterior storage pits, patches of pebble paving and semi permanent built features were discovered, suggesting a modest sophistication of the external built environment.

== Chalcolithic ==
=== Architecture ===
It was concluded that Teleilat el-Ghassul had been the site of several small Chalcolithic villages that subsisted on agriculture and on animal husbandry. Their houses were rectilinear, built of manually shaped dried mud bricks laid on stone foundations. The houses had yards and rooms of various sized which contained different appliances. They display an increased sophistication over time, in construction techniques, in building size and built fittings - internal and external - and a growing regulation and sequestration of exterior spaces.

=== Tools and pottery ===
Many flint tools were discovered in Teleilat el-Ghassul, mainly axes, hoes and sickles, which had probably been used for agriculture. Particularly worthy of note are the fan scrapers - a flat flint tool shaped as a fan - which were mainly used for skinning and butchering animals, and for hide working, but possibly also for working bone and for cutting wood. They may have also had ritualistic significance. The pottery assemblage is particularly rich, utilizing different shapes and decorations. Also, a vessel that was probably used as a butter churn was found on site. It is a large, broad, vessel, with a handle at each end. Much of the Ghassulian pottery was made standing on mats, which left an imprint of the mat design on the bottom of the vessels.

=== Art and religion ===
The most impressive discovery at Teleilat el-Ghassul is the colorful wall paintings found in some of the houses dated to the Chalcolithic period (though they are not present in the earliest Chalcolithic phases). They were applied to the wall on top of a layer of plaster. Their condition is poor and many are missing today. The largest and most complete of those is 1.84 meters in diameter. It is very accurate and delicate, displaying a rather developed painting technique which likely involved the use of rulers to draw neat straight lines.

Some of the wall paintings represent mythological beasts while others, according to some opinions, represent priests wearing ritualistic masks. It is very difficult to infer the meaning of these drawings, though it mostly likely was related to Ghassulian mythology and religion. In one of the houses, over 20 layers of plaster, one on top of the other and each covered in paintings, were found by Hennessey.

No building that could be identified as a temple or as a common place of worship has been found in Teleilat el-Ghassul. It appears these religious paintings adorned the walls of private domiciles, and that, consequently, Ghassulian religious rituals were conducted at home.

==== The 'Star of Ghassul' ====
The eight-rayed 'Star of Ghassul' or 'Ghassulian star' is some 6,000 years old, counting among the earliest examples of the fresco technique, and was discovered in 1932, during the 1929-38 PBI excavations at Ghassul, as the centerpiece of a very large wall painting in one of the houses discovered at the site. The star has a diameter of 1.84 meters and was painted on a light-colored plaster with red, black, white, and yellow pigments. The fact that it was surrounded by masked figures and animals suggested to some researchers that it represented the sun, which was venerated as a major deity, this view challenging the notion that humans of that period hadn't yet developed the concept of abstract gods. More cautious researchers presume it to represents either the sun or another celestial body, possibly associated with the seasons or the cycle of life, and see it as perhaps it symbolizing a deity. The room containing the mural is interpreted as a ritual shrine within a regular dwelling. In 1936 the mural's remains were removed from the site and ended up in a storeroom of what is today the Rockefeller Archaeological Museum in Jerusalem, with some fragments housed by the Pontifical Biblical Institute in Jerusalem. A further PBI dig followed in 1959. Excavations in the 1970s produced an additional section of the murals, now held by The Jordan Museum in Amman. The star was briefly put on display during a temporary exhibition at the new Israel Antiquities Authority headquarters in 2016, and again after restoration and preservation work, at the Rockefeller Museum in 2021-2023.

== See also ==
- Chalcolithic Temple of Ein Gedi
- David Ussishkin (born 1935), Israeli archaeologist
- Beersheba Culture, Late Chalcolithic archaeological culture
