= Ain Sakhri figurine =

Natufian sculpture

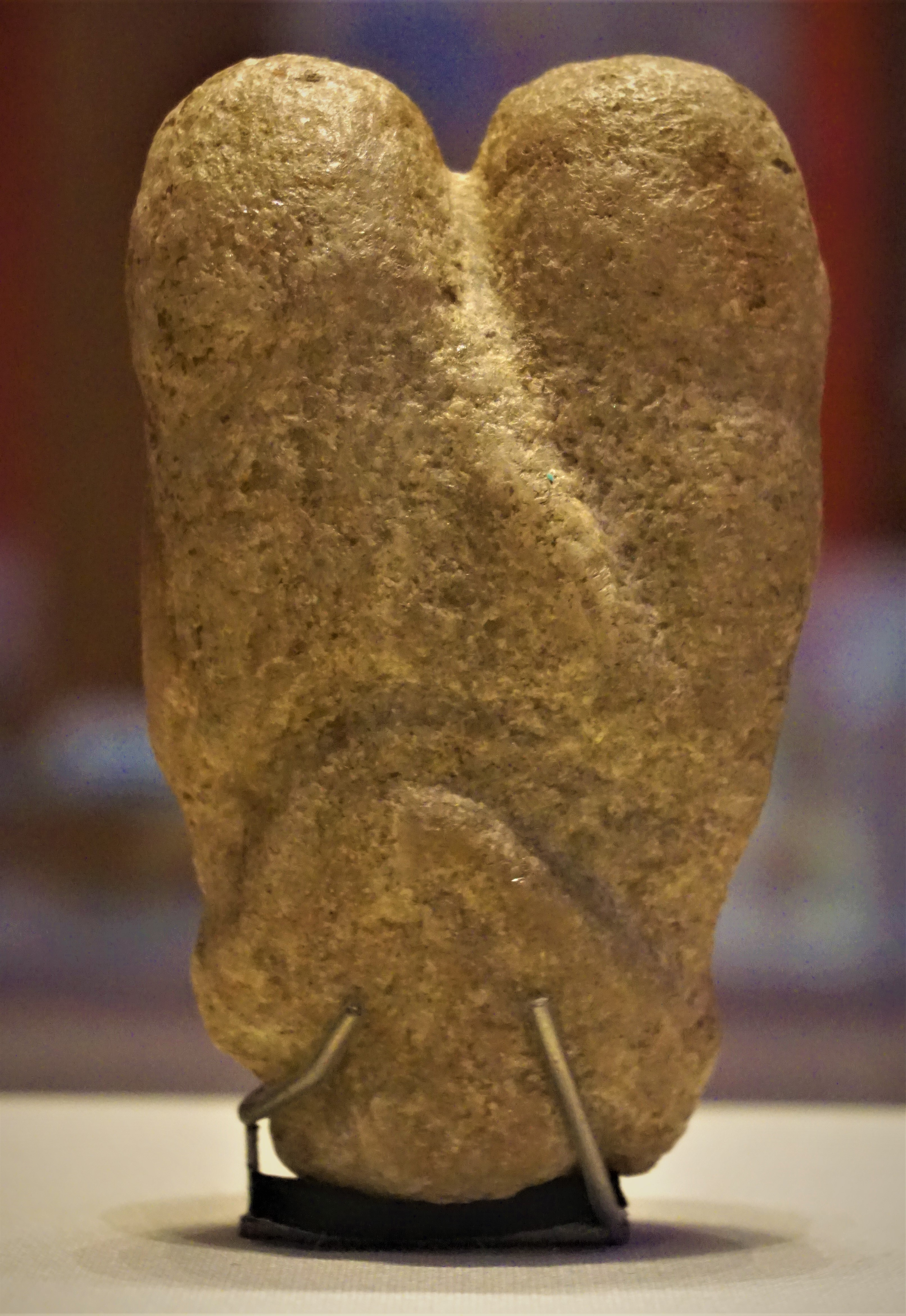
- Material: calcite
- Height: 10.2 cm
- Created: c. 9000 BCE
- Discovered: before 1933 in Ain Sakhri caves, Wadi Khareitoun near Bethlehem, Palestine
- Present location: British Museum, London
- Identification: 1958,1007.1

The Ain Sakhri figurine or Ain Sakhri Lovers is a Natufian sculpture that was found in one of the Ain Sakhri caves near Bethlehem. It is approximately 11,000 years old and thought to be the oldest known representation of two people engaged in sexual intercourse. It is held by the British Museum.

== Discovery ==
The sculpture was identified in 1933 by René Neuville, a French consul in Jerusalem and prehistorian, when looking through random finds obtained by the French Fathers at Bethlehem. He found the stone whilst visiting a small museum with Abbé Breuil. Neuville immediately identified it as important and was able to get an introduction to the Bedouin who had made the finds at Wadi Khareitoun. He was led to a location within the Ain Sakhri caves and it is from these caves that the sculpture gets its name. Excavations of the caves revealed that the cave had been used domestically during the later Epipaleolithic (Natufian). For this reason it is thought that the figurine was used domestically and had not been left there as part of a funeral.

After the death of René Neuville in 1952, it was purchased by the British Museum at Sotheby's in 1958 from M. Y. Neuville.

== Appearance ==
The sculpture was made by carving a single "calcite cobble" which was picked away with a stone point to identify the position of the couple. Although it lacks details, such as faces, it is considered to be a clever piece of sculpture. Artist Marc Quinn has noted that the figure looks different depending on the viewer's perspective, and may resemble a couple, a penis, breasts, or a vagina depending on this perspective, or two testicles when viewed upside-down, from the bottom. Quinn compared it to a modern pornographic film where the action may include close-ups and long shots. It is clear that the figures in the couple are facing each other, but the sex of the figures can only be presumed.

== See also ==
- List of Stone Age art

== Bibliography ==
- B. Boyd and J. Cook, 'A reconsideration of the "Ain Sakhri" figurine', Proceedings of the Prehistoric Society, 59 (1993), pp. 399–405

Preceded by 6: Bird-shaped pestle	A History of the World in 100 Objects; Object 7	Succeeded by 8: El-Amra clay model of cattle
