= Alexis Mallon =

French Jesuit priest and archaeologist

Alexis Mallon (1875–1934), more commonly known as Père Mallon, was a French Jesuit priest and archaeologist. He founded the Pontifical Biblical Institute in Jerusalem and made important early contributions to the study of the prehistory of the Levant with his excavations at Teleilat el Ghassul (1929–1934).

== Education and career ==
Born in France, Mallon received his Jesuit training in Beirut, Lebanon, and spent four years studying theology in England between 1905 and 1909. In Beirut he also studied languages and taught Egyptian and Coptic at Saint Joseph University. He published one of the first grammars of Coptic in 1904.

In 1910, he was transferred to the newly-founded Pontifical Biblical Institute and in 1913 was sent to Jerusalem to set up a branch of the institute there. After being forced to move to Cairo by the outbreak of the First World War, Mallon returned to Palestine in 1919 and was finally able to establish the Pontifical Biblical Institute in Jerusalem in 1927.

== Archaeology ==
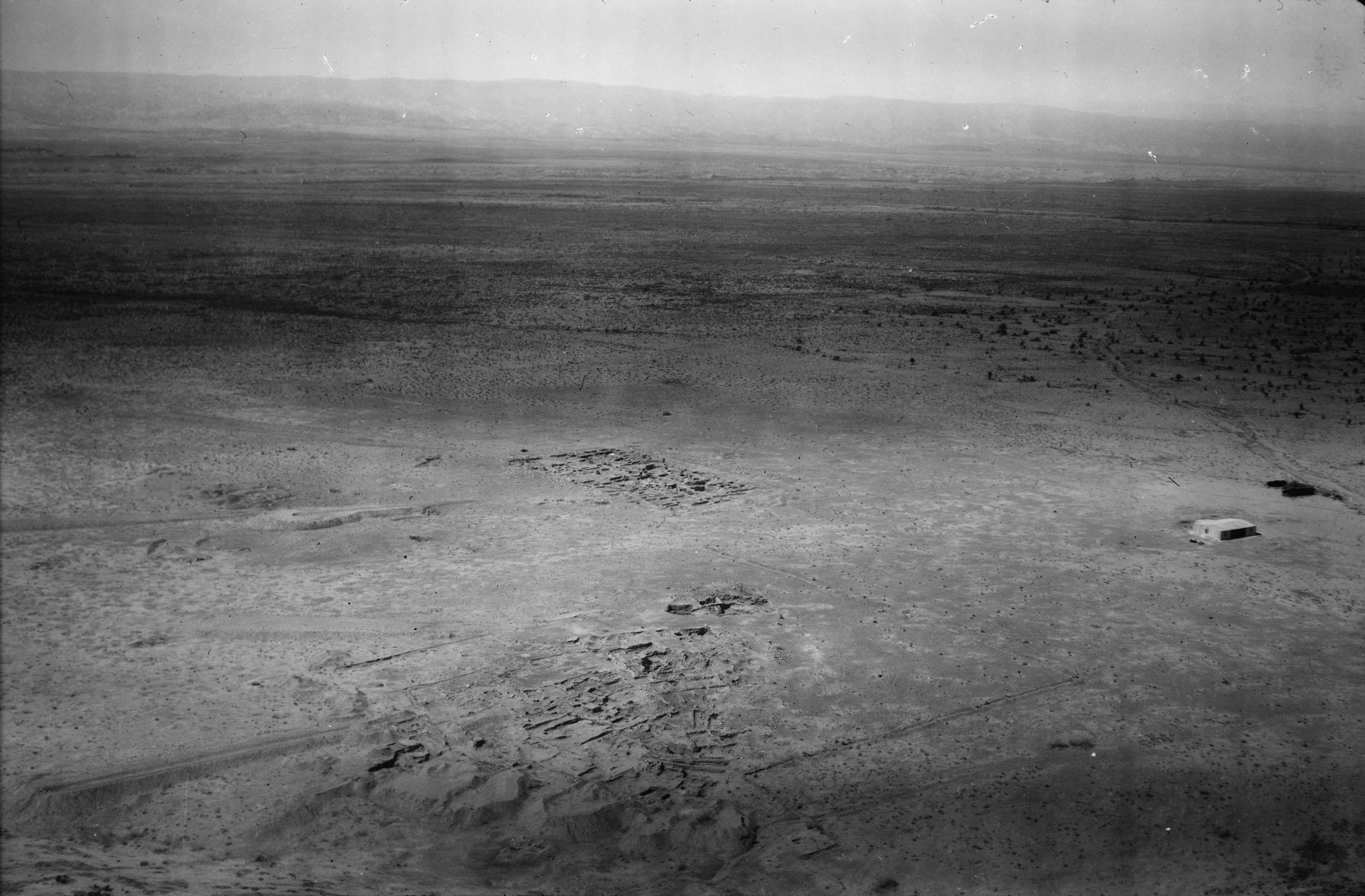
Aerial photograph of Teleilat el Ghassul during Mallon's excavations, 1931.

Mallon's interest in archaeology was fostered by Godefroy Zumoffen, a fellow Jesuit in Beirut. Together they compiled the first systematic gazetteer of sites in the Levant, published in 1925. Unlike many of his contemporaries in the region, and despite his calling, Mallon's interests were in prehistory rather than biblical archaeology. He discovered prehistoric stone tools at Shuqba Cave in 1924 and conducted trial excavations there in 1928. Subsequent excavations at Shuqba by British archaeologist Dorothy Garrod unearthed the first traces of the Mesolithic outside of Europe and defined the Natufian culture.

Mallon's most notable contribution to archaeology was his excavations at Teleilat el Ghassul on the northern shore of the Dead Sea. Contemporary press reports proclaimed the site to be the remains of the biblical Sodom and Gomorrah, but Mallon himself considered this unlikely. He directed excavations there until his death in 1934, establishing the site as one of the key Chalcolithic sequences in the region and the type site of the Ghassulian culture. Robert Koeppel of the Pontifical Biblical Institute continued the excavations after Mallon's death.

Mallon had a significant influence on René Neuville, introducing him to prehistoric archaeology when he first arrived in Jerusalem as a diplomat in 1926. The two went on to collaborate on excavations at Oumm Qatafa, and Neuville assisted Mallon at Teleilat el Ghassul.

== Selected publications ==
- Grammaire Copte (1904)
