= Pontifical Biblical Institute =

Higher education institution in Rome and Jerusalem

- Latin: Pontificium Institutum Biblicum
- Founder: Pope Pius X
- Established: 1909; 117 years ago
- Mission: Biblical and Ancient Near Eastern Studies
- Focus: Catholic, Jesuit
- President: Peter Dubovský, S.J.
- Rector: P. Mark A. Lewis, S.J.
- Location: Piazza della Pilotta; Rome, Italy; Paul Emile Botta St. Jerusalem, Israel
- Coordinates: 41°53′56″N 12°29′01″E
- Interactive map of Pontifical Biblical Institute
- Website: biblico.it

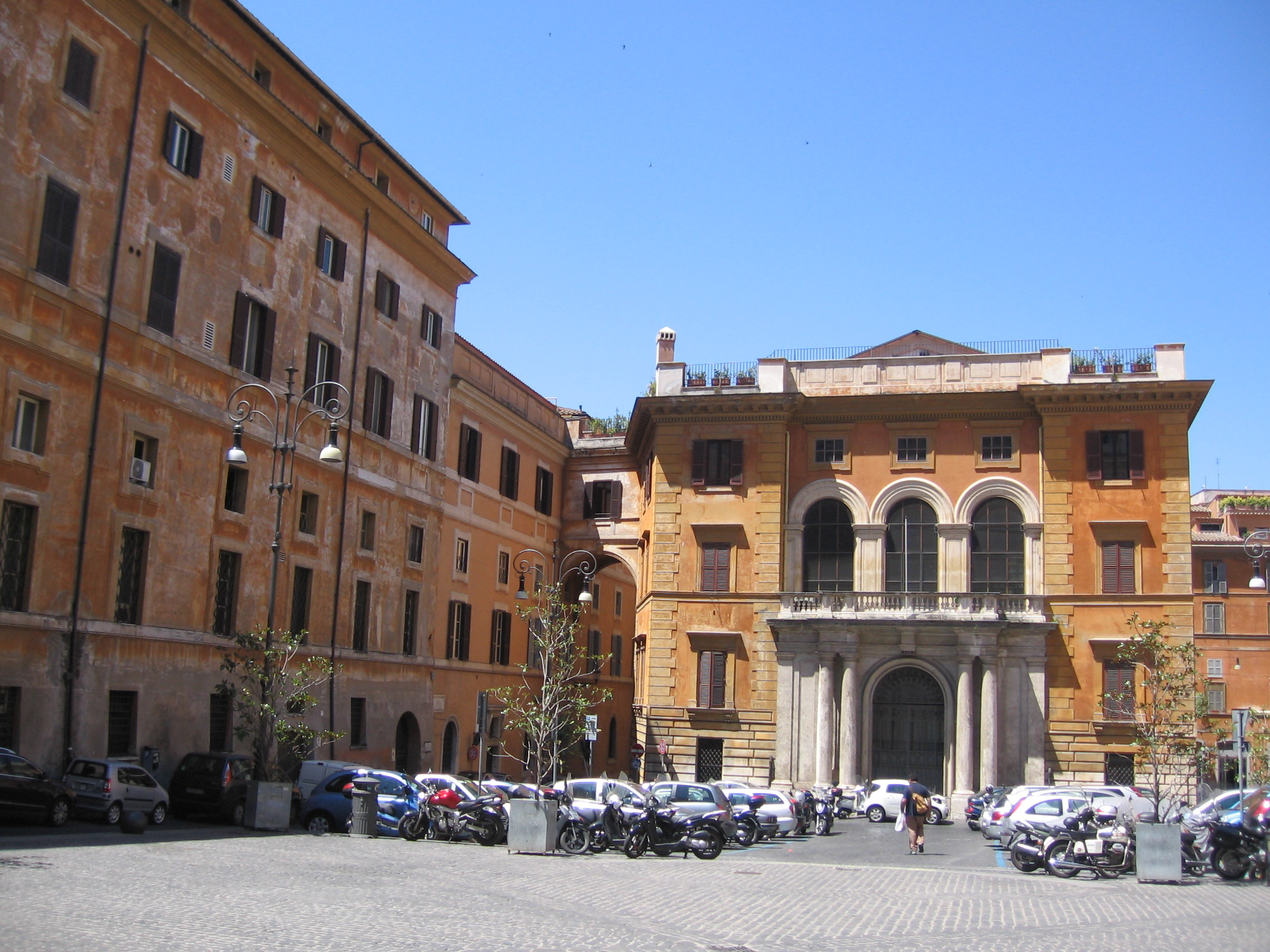
Biblical Institute, Rome

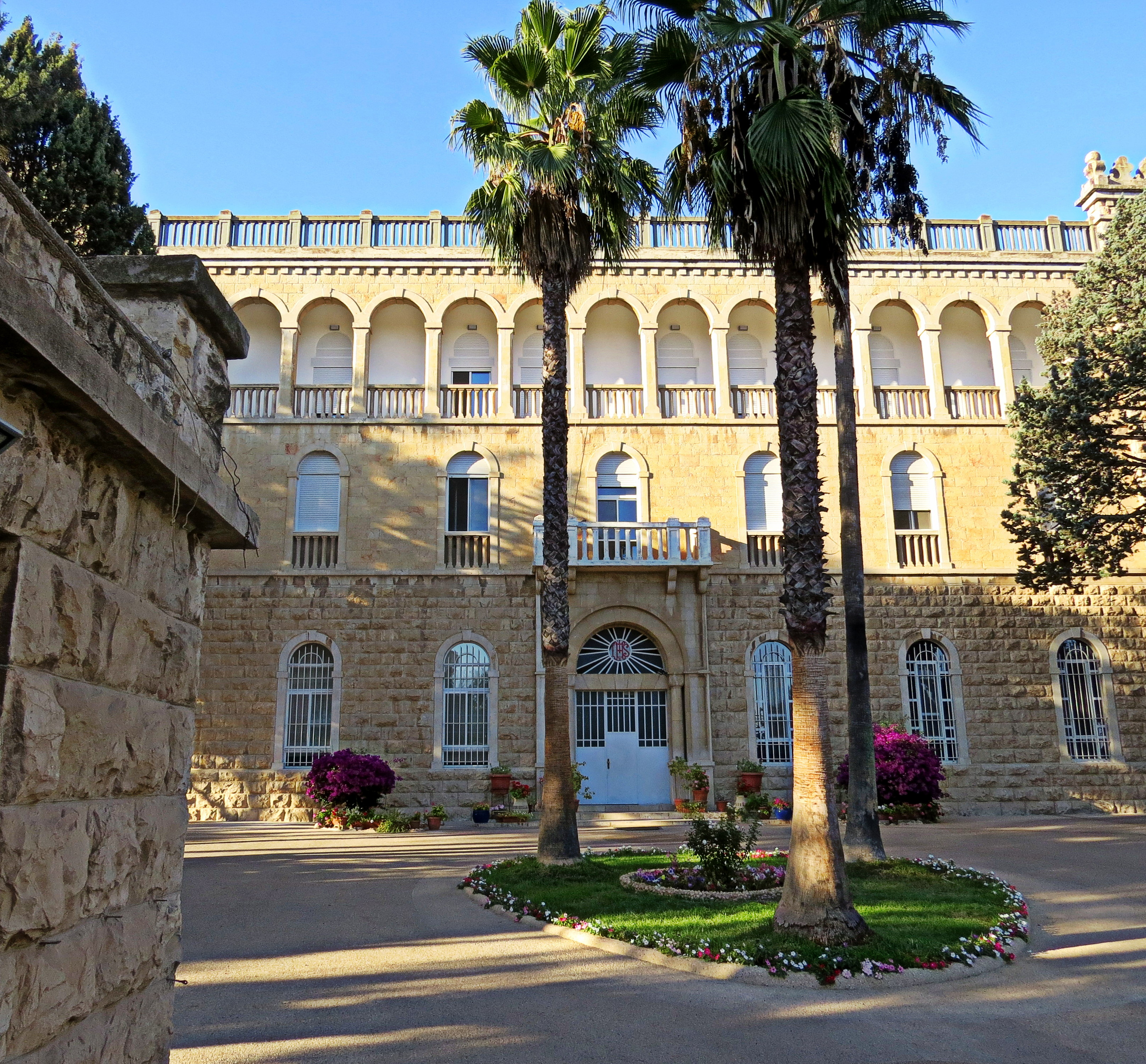
Biblical Institute, Jerusalem

The Pontifical Biblical Institute (also known as Biblicum) is a research and postgraduate teaching institution specialised in biblical and ancient Near Eastern studies located in Rome. Founded in 1909 by Pope Pius X, it is an institution of the Holy See entrusted to the Society of Jesus (Jesuits). Since 1927, the Institute has had a branch in the city of Jerusalem.

Along with the Pontifical Oriental Institute, the Pontifical Biblical Institute was incorporated into the Pontifical Gregorian University under a single rector when the new statutes of the Gregorian took effect on 19 May 2024.

== History ==
The Pontifical Biblical Institute, along with the Pontifical Biblical Institute Library, was founded by Pope Pius X in the apostolic letter Vinea Electa in 1909 as a centre of advanced studies in Holy Scripture. At first, the Institute prepared students for exams at the Pontifical Biblical Commission. In 1916, it was licensed by Pope Benedict XV to grant academic degrees in the name of the commission. In 1928, it was licensed by Pope Pius XI to grant doctorates in affiliation with the Pontifical Gregorian University, independently of the commission.

A branch was opened in Jerusalem in 1927.

In 1932, the Oriental Faculty was founded.

== Jerusalem house ==
A branch was opened in Jerusalem by Alexis Mallon SJ in 1927, which functions as a base of operations in the Holy Land for the school in Rome. It has a library and a museum, and currently offers to students registered for the licence in the Biblical Faculty three academic programs, which are part of their overall curriculum: a Biblical Hebrew program in collaboration with The Hebrew University of Jerusalem; courses in Biblical Aramaic, exegesis, theology, and biblical history, archaeology and geography at the École Biblique; and a course in biblical archeology and geography at the Studium Biblicum Franciscanum.

=== Museum ===
The Museum of the PBI in Jerusalem contains two main parts: the Egyptian collection boasting a mummy, a coffin lid and the axe-head of Khufu; and the Teleilat Ghassul collection, named after the Jordan Valley type-site of the Ghassulian culture dating to the Chalcolithic, with wall paintings including a copy of the 'Ghassulian star', as well as pottery. The Jerusalem house received the mummy of the 2nd century BCE priest Iret-hor-iru as a gift from Jesuits in Alexandria one year after its establishment, in 1928.

== Rectors ==
All of its rectors have been Jesuit priests. Cardinal Bea is particularly noteworthy for having defended the university against charges of Modernism before the Second Vatican Council.

- Leopold Fonck (1909–1924)
- John J. O'Rourke (1924–1930)
- Augustin Bea (1930–1949)
- Ernest Vogt (1949–1963)
- Roderick A. MacKenzie (1963–1969)
- Carlo Maria Martini (1969–1978)
- Maurice Gilbert (1978–1984)
- Albert Vanhoye (1984–1990)
- Klemens Stock (1990–1996)
- Robert F. O'Toole (1996–2002)
- Stephen Pisano (2002–2008)
- José María Abrego de Lacy (2008–2014)
- Michael Kolarcik (2014–2023)
- Peter Dubovský (since 2023-May 18 2024)

== Alumni ==
Among the prominent alumni of the Biblicum, the following were elevated to the episcopate and/or the cardinalate:

- Cardinal Archbishop Bernardus Johannes Alfrink
- Cardinal Carlos Aguiar Retes
- Cardinal Augustin Bea
- Cardinal Archbishop Giuseppe Betori
- Bishop Luc-André Bouchard
- Archbishop Rogelio Cabrera López
- Cardinal Patriarch Marco Cé
- Archbishop Mark Coleridge
- Cardinal Archbishop Thomas Christopher Collins
- Cardinal Archbishop Luis Concha Córdoba
- Bishop Martin Drennan
- Archbishop Cornelius Fontem Esua
- Cardinal Archbishop Ermenegildo Florit
- Cardinal Prosper Grech
- Cardinal Benno Gut
- Cardinal Archbishop Franz König
- Cardinal Archbishop Giacomo Lercaro
- Cardinal Bishop Achille Liénart
- Bishop Devadass Ambrose Mariadoss
- Cardinal Archbishop Carlo Maria Martini
- Cardinal Jorge María Mejía
- Cardinal Archbishop Albert Gregory Meyer
- Archbishop Michael Neary
- Archbishop Cesare Nosiglia
- Cardinal Archbishop John Onaiyekan
- Archbishop Kieran O'Reilly
- Cardinal Archbishop Laurent Monsengwo Pasinya
- Cardinal Archbishop Fernando Quiroga y Palacios
- Cardinal Archbishop Malcolm Ranjith
- Cardinal Gianfranco Ravasi
- Cardinal Archbishop Rubén Salazar Gómez
- Bishop Enrique San Pedro
- Archbishop Pietro Sfair
- Cardinal Archbishop Adrianus Johannes Simonis
- Bishop Richard J. Sklba
- Bishop Jan Bernard Szlaga
- Cardinal Gustavo Testa
- Bishop Donald Walter Trautman
- Cardinal Archbishop Peter Turkson
- Cardinal Albert Vanhoye
- Archbishop John Francis Whealon
- Bishop Alexander M. Zaleski

== See also ==
- École Biblique
- Studium Biblicum Franciscanum
- List of Jesuit sites
