= John Fuller (cricketer) =

English cricketer, clergyman, and academic

Personal information
- Full name: John Mee Fuller
- Born: 4 December 1834; Westminster, London, England
- Died: 16 August 1893 (aged 58); Combe Martin, Devon, England
- Batting: Unknown

Domestic team information
- Years: Team
- 1854–1858: Marylebone Cricket Club
- 1855–1858: Cambridge University
- 1857–1858: Cambridgeshire

Career statistics
Competition	First-class
Matches	32
Runs scored	579
Batting average	11.13
100s/50s	–/1
Top score	69
Catches/stumpings	17/–
- Source: Cricinfo, 19 August 2019

John Mee Fuller (4 December 1834 – 16 August 1893) was an English first-class cricketer, clergyman and academic.

The son of Reverend Thomas Fuller, he was born at Westminster in December 1834. He was educated at Marlborough College, before going up to St John's College, Cambridge. Prior to beginning his studies at Cambridge, Fuller made his debut in first-class cricket for the Marylebone Cricket Club in 1854, making three appearances. The following year he began playing first-class cricket for Cambridge University, debuting against Oxford University in The University Match at Lord's. He played first-class cricket for Cambridge until 1858, making a total of eleven appearances. He scored 290 runs at an average of 17.05, with a high score of 69. Fuller also played for the MCC until 1858, also making a total of eleven appearances. However, his batting was less fruitful for the MCC, yielding 92 runs at an average of 5.75. During his time studying at Cambridge, Fuller also played first-class cricket for Cambridgeshire on three occasions from 1857–58, for the Gentlemen of England on five occasions from 1856–58, and for the Gentlemen in the Gentlemen v Players fixtures of 1856 and 1858. He gained a blue in cricket each year between 1855–58 and captained the university in 1857 and 1858.

After graduating in 1858, Fuller spent time as a Crosse Scholar in 1858–59 and a Tyrwhitt Scholar in 1859. After completing his scholarships, he became a Church of England clergyman after leaving Oxford, taking holy orders in 1860. He was the curate of Christ Church, Ealing from 1860–62 and of Grosvenor Chapel from 1862–63. He worked alongside his father as the curate of St Peter's Church, Pimlico for seven years from 1863–70. From 1870–74, he was the editorial secretary for the Society for Promoting Christian Knowledge, in addition to serving as the vicar of Bexley in from 1874–93. Fuller was a professor of ecclesiastical history at King's College London from 1883–93 and wrote several books on biblical topics. He later served as the chaplain to Edward White Benson, the Archbishop of Canterbury from 1889–93. Fuller died suddenly on 16 August 1893 at Combe Martin, while driving between Ilfracombe and Minehead.

== Works ==
- An Essay on the Authenticity of the Book of Daniel (1864)
- The Students' Commentary on the Holy Bible: Pentateuch (1879)
- A Dictionary of the Bible: Comprising Its Antiquities, Biography, Geography, and Natural History (in three volumes) (1893)
- The Four Gospels: Arranged in the Form of a Harmony, from the Text of the Authorised Version (1885)
