= Wadi Khureitun =

Seasonal riverbed and ravine in Palestine

Coordinates: 31.5847°N 35.3631°E

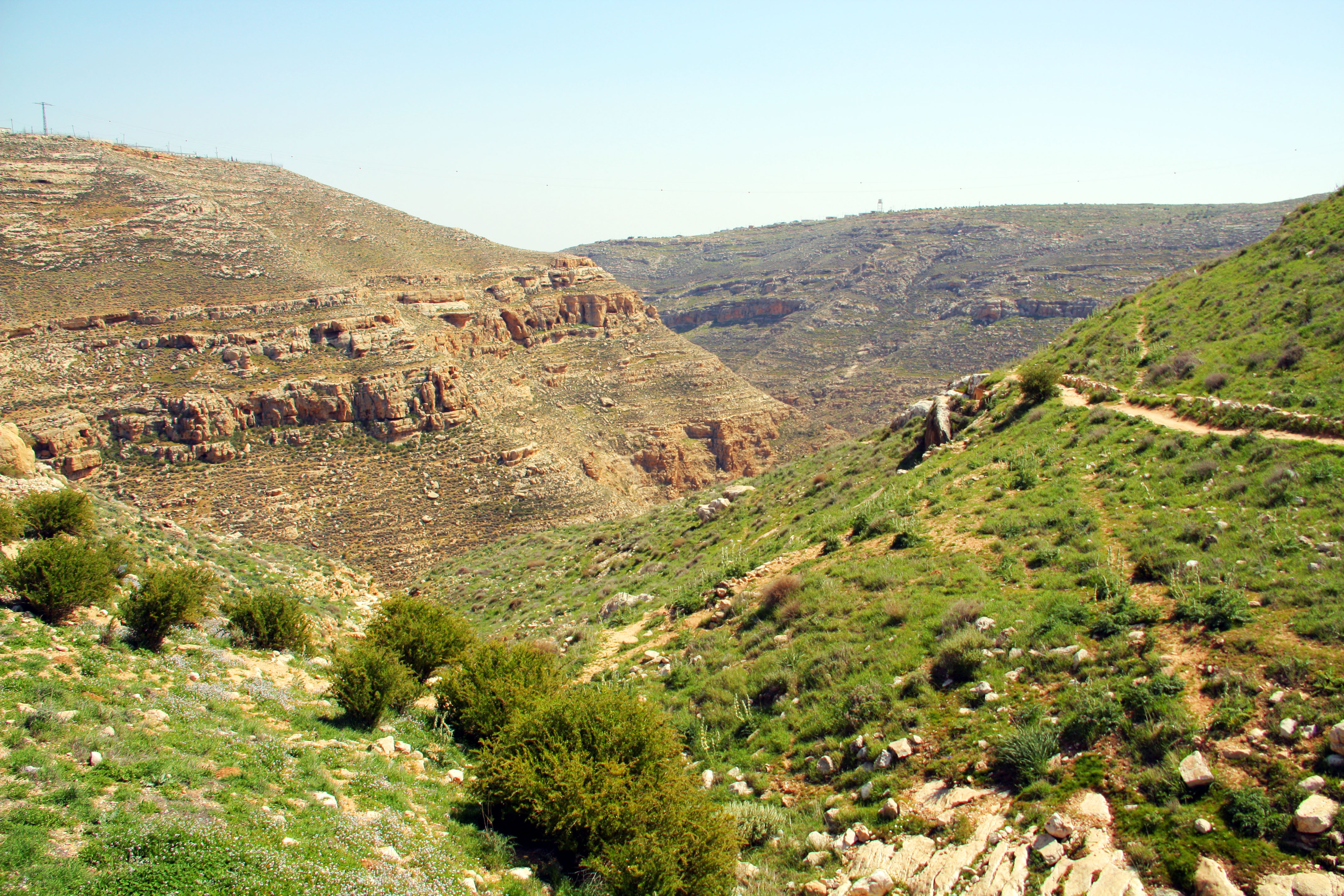
Valley of Khureitun

Wadi Khureitun (Arabic; also spelled Khareitoun, Khareitun, Kharitoun, Haritoun) or Nahal Tekoa (Hebrew) is a wadi in a deep ravine in the Judaean Desert in the West Bank, west of the Dead Sea, rising near the Israeli settlement of Tekoa.

== Name ==
The Hebrew name, Nahal Tekoa ("Tekoa Stream"), and the English name used in some Christian contexts, Tekoa Valley, is derived from the ancient Judahite town of Tekoa.

The Arabic name, Wadi Khureitun, comes from the early Christian hermit, Chariton, who founded his third lavra in this valley, whose ruins are now known in Arabic as Khirbet ('ruins of') Khureitun. The monastery, founded in about 345, was known at different times as Souka, the Old Laura, and as the monastery of Chariton, the latter name being preserved in the Arabic name of the wadi.

== Description, history, archaeology ==
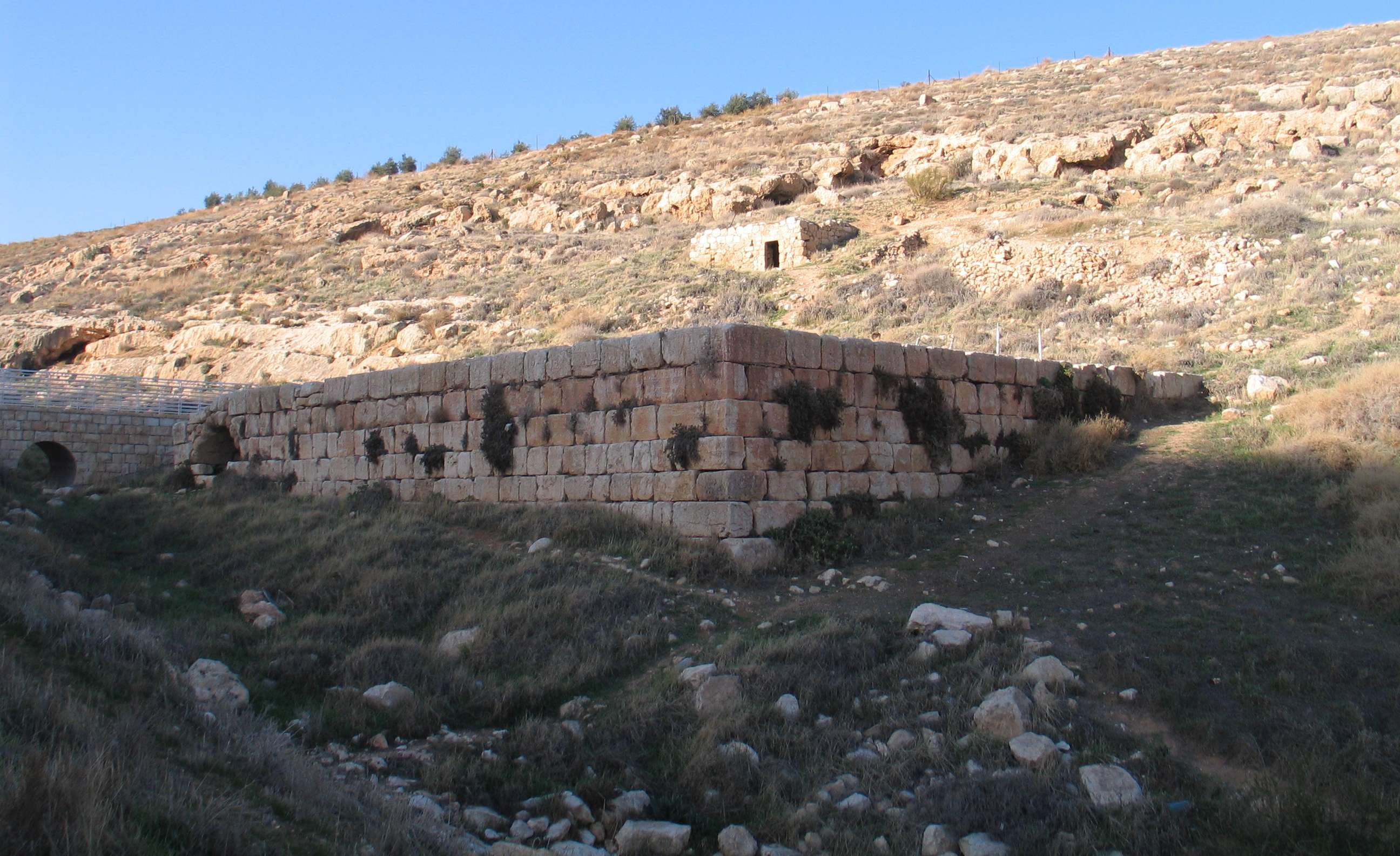
Ruins of the Souka monastery

A hiking path on the west of the wadi passes a number of prehistoric caves on its way south to the Chariton Monastery ruins.

The archaeological Stone Age (Mesolithic and Neolithic) site of El Khiam is located in this area.

In two caves (Haner and Hapitria), remains from the Bar Kokhba revolt (132–136 CE) were found, including pottery, keys, and a coin issued during the revolt. The coin, a tetradrachm from the third year of the uprising, bears the slogan "For the Freedom of Jerusalem" and depicts the Jerusalem Temple on one side and the four species on the other. Those who sought refuge there may have come from the nearby villages of Tekoa and Khirbet en-Natash, as well as from the palace-fortress of Herodium, which served as a regional headquarters for the rebels. Since no skeletons were found at the site, it has been suggested that these refugees later traveled further east to caves in the Judaean Desert, although other possibilities exist.

Saint Chariton the Confessor (end of 3rd century-ca. 350) founded here the Lavra of Souka, later called the Old Lavra, and even later, apparently after the remains of Chariton were translated there from the laura of Pharan after the Muslim conquest, it became known as the monastery of Chariton.

Existing karstic caves from the chalk of the wadi were expanded and used as hermit abodes by monks from the lavras of Saint Chariton and of a later desert monk and saint, Euthymius the Great.

Modern Tekoa's former chief rabbi Menachem Froman's son, Tzuri, lived in a cave in the desert canyon (wadi) behind the town. Two young Israeli settlers from Tekoa, were killed by unknown assailants in 2001.

== See also ==
- Ain Sakhri figurine, Natufian, oldest representation of humans having sex
