= Chariton the Confessor =

3rd–4th-century Christian saint from Anatolia

Saint Chariton the Confessor
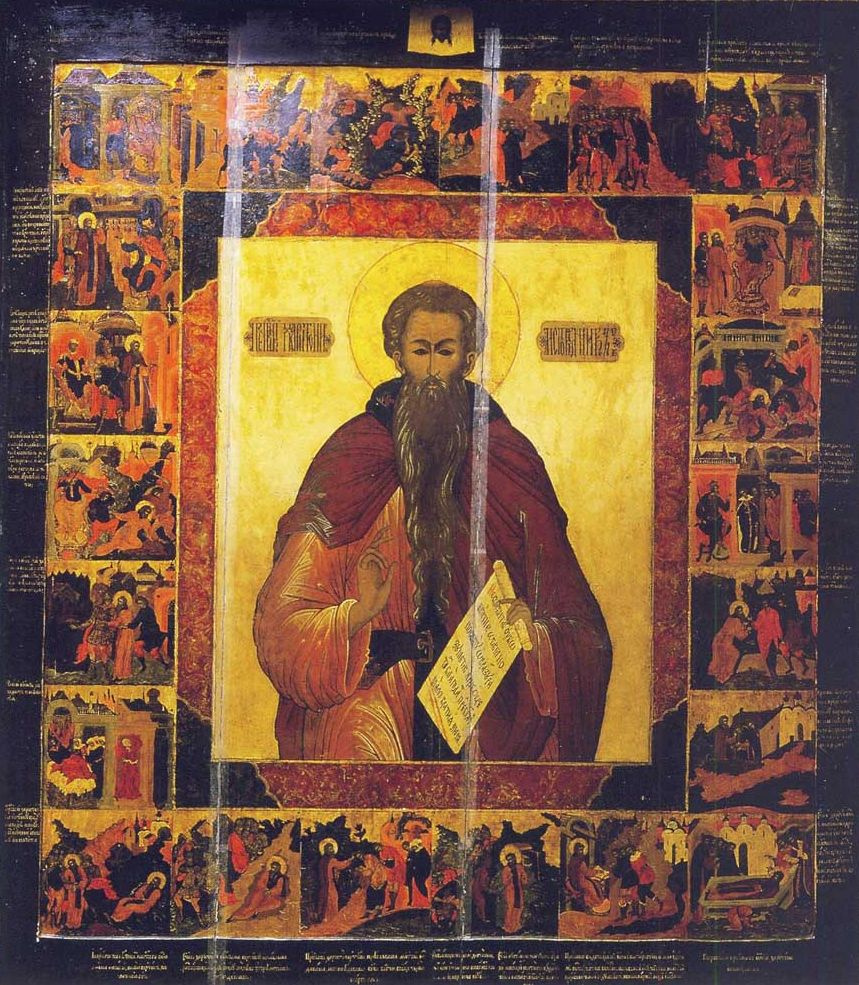
- A Russian Orthodox icon of St. Chariton
- Born: Iconium, Phrygia
- Venerated in: Eastern Orthodox Church; Roman Catholic Church
- Major shrine: Sille, Konya
- Feast: September 28
- Patronage: Konya (Iconium)

Chariton the Confessor (Greek: Χαρίτων; mid-3rd century, Iconium, Asia Minor – c. 350, Judaean desert) was an early Christian monk. He is venerated as a saint by both the Western and Eastern Churches. His remembrance day is September 28.

== Life ==
=== Sources ===
We know about his vita from the 6th-century "Life of Chariton", written by an anonymous monk, which holds elements supported by modern archaeological excavations.

=== Early life ===
Chariton was a native of Iconium in the Byzantine province of Lycaonia. Under the reign of Emperor Aurelian (270–275) he was tortured during a persecution against Christians. Released from prison after Aurelian's death, he regretted not having died as a martyr.

=== Pharan near Jerusalem ===
After his release in 275, during a pilgrimage to Jerusalem and other holy places, Chariton was abducted by bandits and brought to a cave in the Pharan Valley (upper Wadi Qelt). The traditional account states that his abductors died by drinking wine that was poisoned by a snake. Chariton decided to remain a hermit in the cave after this miraculous death of his abductors. There he built a church and established a monastery, the first one of the lavra type.

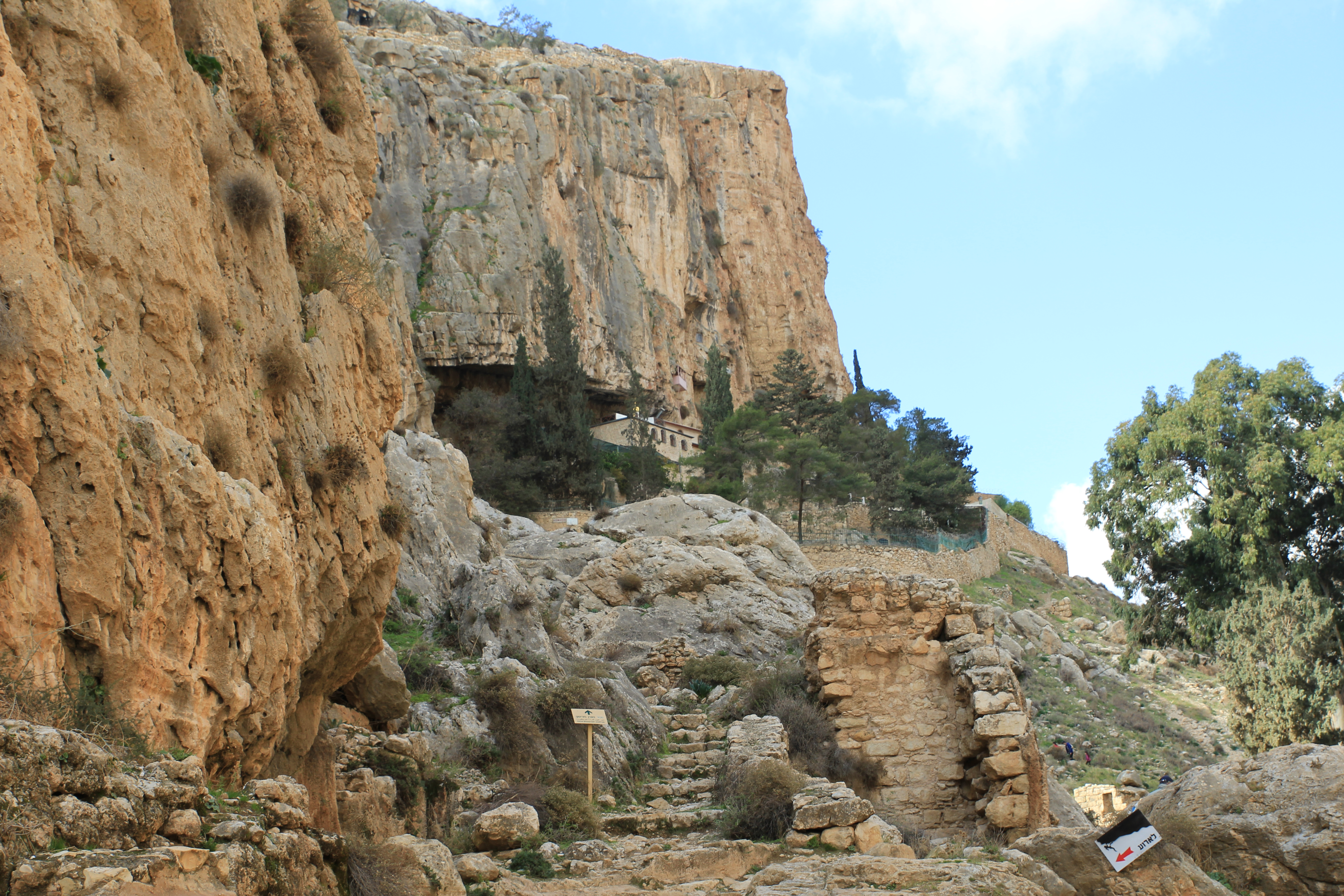
The entrance to Chariton Monastery in Wadi Qelt.

=== Douka near Jericho ===
Later he moved to the Mount of Temptation near Jericho, where he established the lavra of Douka on the ruins of the Hasmonean and Herodian Dok Fortress.

=== Souka (Old Lavra at Tekoa) ===
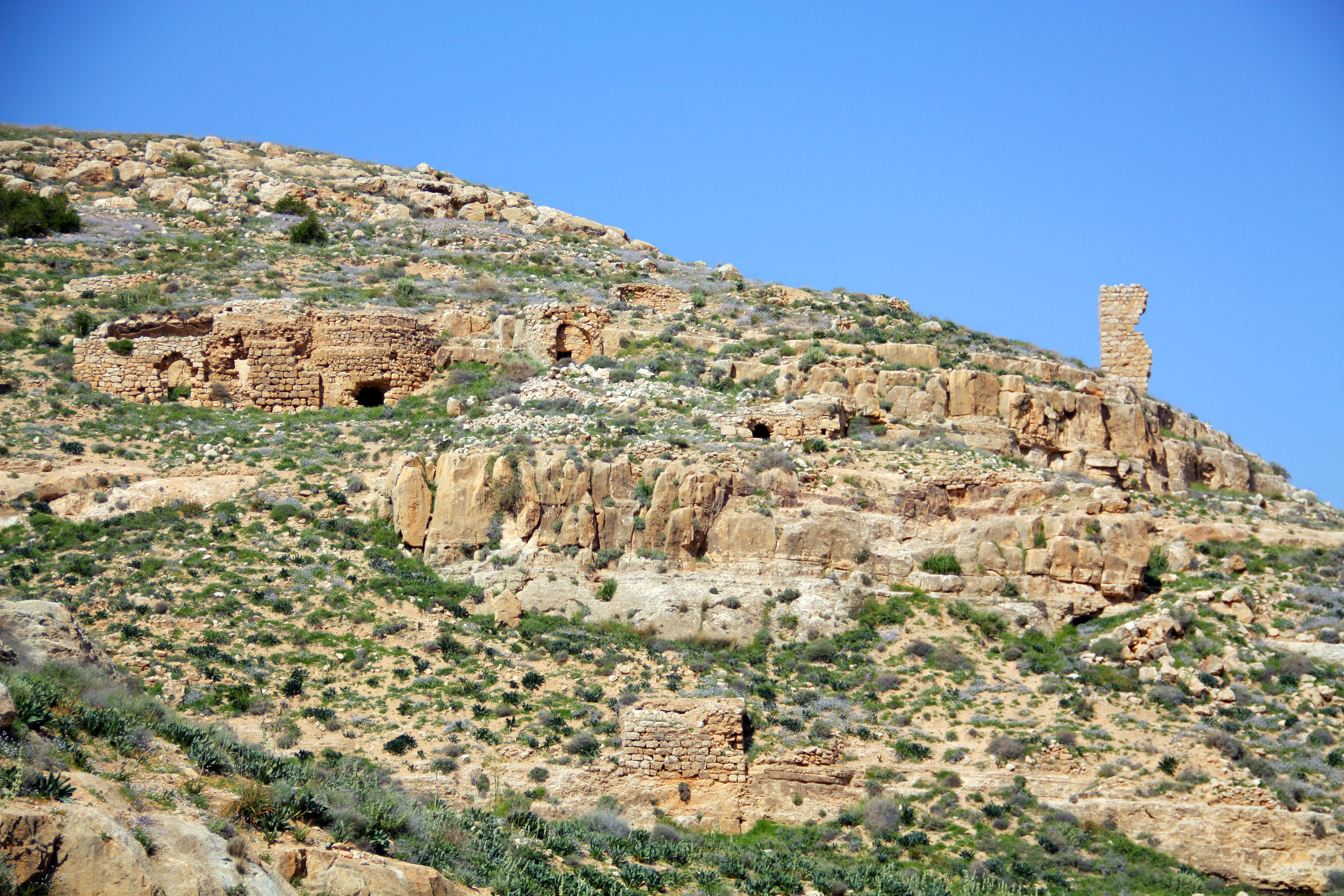
Remains of Souka, Palestine

In about 345, Chariton moved on to establish a third monastery in the Valley of Tekoa, initially named Souka and later, the Old Lavra. After the Muslim conquest Chariton's remains were translated from the lavra of Pharan to the Old Lavra, known today as the Monastery of Chariton and preserved in the Arabic name of the wadi (valley of a seasonal stream), Wadi Khureitun.

In all three locations his fame attracted Christians wishing to learn from him but preferring solitude instead, he repeatedly moved on. At Souka he eventually settled in a cliff side cave near the centre of the lavra, known as the "Hanging Cave of Chariton" where his remains were discovered by Israeli archaeologist Yizhar Hirschfeld.

== Legacy ==
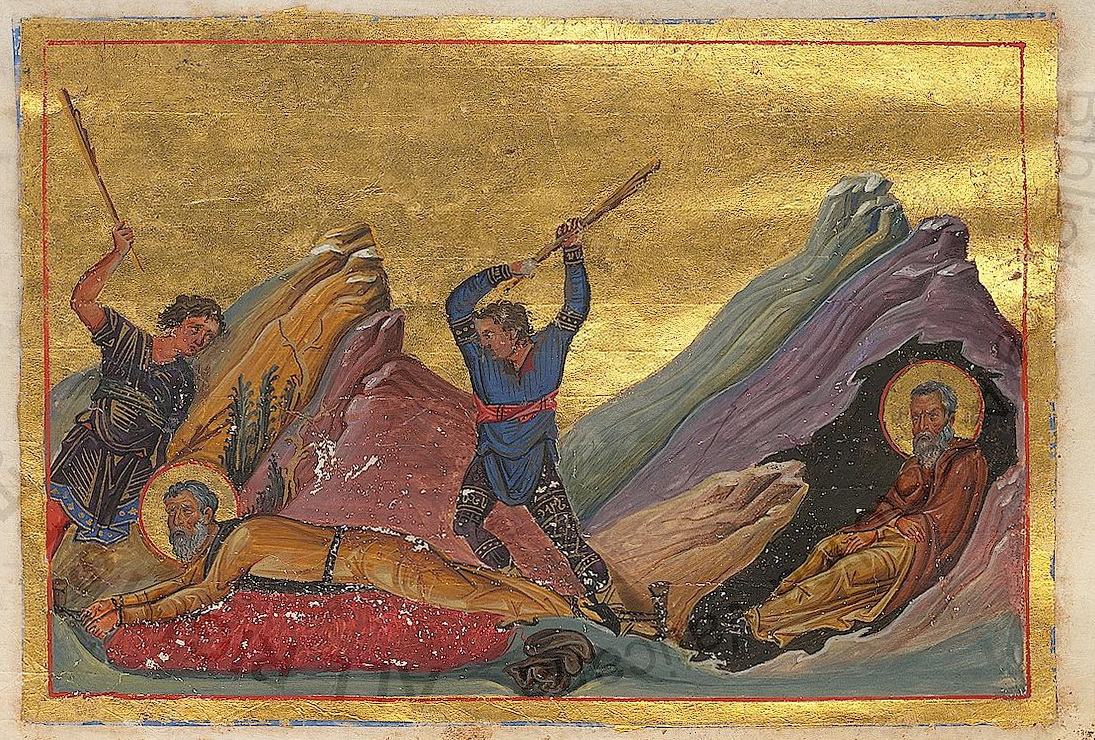
Miniature from the Menologion of Basil II

The importance of Chariton lays mainly in the fact that he established by his own example the rules for monastic life in the Judaean desert, in the context of lavra-type monasteries. These rules became the main traits of monastic rule everywhere, based on asceticism and solitude: he lived in silence, only ate certain types of food and only after sundown, performed manual work, spent the night in an alternation of sleep and psalmody, prayed at fixed hours, stayed in his cell, and controlled his thoughts.

If Chariton is considered to be the founder of monasticism in the Judaean desert, his almost-contemporary Hilarion (c. 291–371), an anchorite who followed the example of his Egyptian mentor, Anthony the Great (c. 251–356), retreating to the wilderness in the coastal area near Gaza, is considered by his biographer Jerome to be the founder of Palestinian monasticism altogether.

According to tradition, Chariton was the one to compile the "Office of the Monastic Tonsure".

== See also ==
- Desert Fathers and Desert Mothers, early Christian hermits, ascetics, and monks who lived mainly in the Scetes desert of Egypt beginning around the third century AD
- Euthymius the Great (377–473), founder of monasteries in Palestine and saint
  - Theoctistus (died 451), who together with Euthymius established and led the first coenobium (communal monastic settlement) in the Judaean desert
- Hilarion (291–371), anchorite and saint considered by Jerome to be the founder of Palestinian monasticism
- Pachomius the Great (c. 292–348), Egyptian saint generally recognized as the founder of Christian cenobitic monasticism
- Paul of Thebes (c. 226/7 – c. 341), known as "Paul, the First Hermit", who preceded both Anthony and Chariton
- Theodosius the Cenobiarch (c. 423–529), monk and saint, traditionally credited with organizing the cenobitic way of life in the Judaean desert
- Sabbas the Sanctified (439–532), monk and saint, founded several monasteries in Palestine

== Bibliography ==
- Leah Di Segni: The Life of Chariton, in: Ascetic Behavior in Greco-Roman Antiquity: A Sourcebook (Studies in Antiquity and Christianity), Vincent L. Wimbush, Minneapolis 1990, ISBN 0-8006-3105-6, p. 393–421.
- Shehadeh, Raja: Palestinian Walks, pp. 136–7. Profile Books (2008), ISBN 978-1-86197-899-8
