= Horatio Balch Hackett =

American biblical scholar (1808–1875)

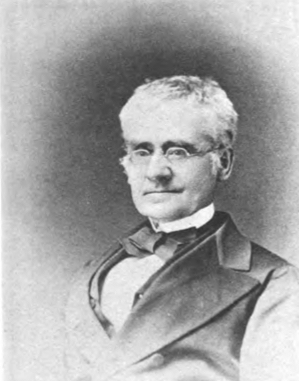
Horatio Balch Hackett

Horatio Balch Hackett (December 27, 1808 – November 2, 1875), American biblical scholar, was born in Salisbury, Massachusetts. His father, Richard Hackett, was a ship-builder who died when Horatio was only five years old. Hence, Horatio and his brothers were raised mostly by their mother, Martha née Balch.

He was educated at Phillips Academy and at Amherst College, where he graduated as valedictorian in 1830, and at Andover Theological Seminary, where he graduated in 1834. He was adjunct professor of Latin and Greek Languages and Literature at Brown University in 1835-1838 and professor of Hebrew Literature there in 1838-1839.

He was ordained to the Baptist ministry in 1839—he had become a Baptist at Andover as the result of preparing a paper on baptism in the New Testament and the Fathers—and in 1839-1868 he was professor of Biblical literature and interpretation in Newton Theological Institution where his most important work was the introduction of the modern German methods of Biblical criticism, which he had learned from Moses Stuart at Andover and with which he made himself more familiar in Germany (especially under Tholuck at Halle) in 1841.

He traveled in Egypt and Palestine in 1852, and then in 1857 published a book on his observations and experiences entitled Illustrations of Scripture: A Tour Through the Holy Land.

In 1858-1859 he traveled around Greece, becoming proficient in modern Greek. From 1870 until his death in Rochester, New York, he was professor of Biblical literature and New Testament exegesis in the Rochester Theological Seminary. He was a great teacher but a greater critical and exegetical scholar.

== Published work ==
- Exercises in Hebrew Grammar And Selections from the Greek Scriptures to be Translated Into Hebrew, with Notes, Hebrew Phrases and References to Approved Works in Greek and Hebrew Philology (Andover: Allen, Morrill & Wardwell, 1847)
- Illustrations of Scripture: Suggested by a Tour Through the Holy Land (New York:T. Nelson and Sons, 1857)
- A Commentary on the Original Text of the Acts of the Apostles (Boston: Gould and Lincoln, 1858)
- Christian Memorials of the War: Or, Scenes and Incidents Illustrative of Religious Faith and Principle, Patriotism and Bravery in Our Army. With Historical Notes (Boston: Gould and Lincoln, 1864)
