= List of ancient Near Eastern scribes =

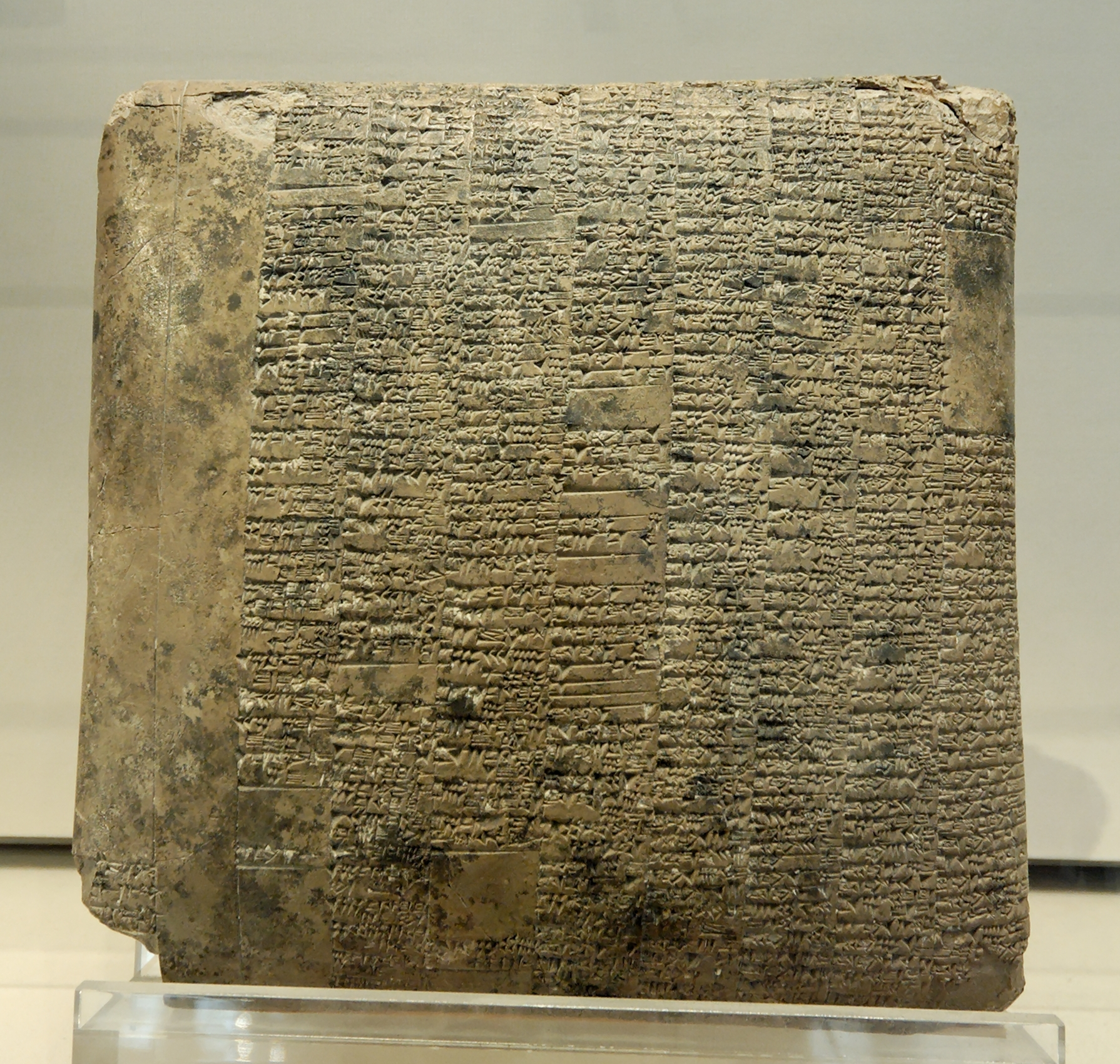
An unnamed Sumerian scribe's accounts tablet for a basketry workshop, Ur, c. 2040 BC

This is a list of Near Eastern scribes. Besides the common clay tablet used in Mesopotamia, cylinder seals, stelas, reliefs, etc. are other commonly used mediums of the Near Eastern scribes.

== List of scribes ==
Scribe	Time-period	Notes
Abijah	10th century BC	Scribe of the Gezer calendar
Azi (scribe)
Baruch ben Neriah
Bêl-bân-aplu		See: 0 (number)#History
Ezra
Sin-liqe-unninni		one author of version- Epic of Gilgamesh

== See also ==
- Cylinder seals
