= Archaeology of Israel =

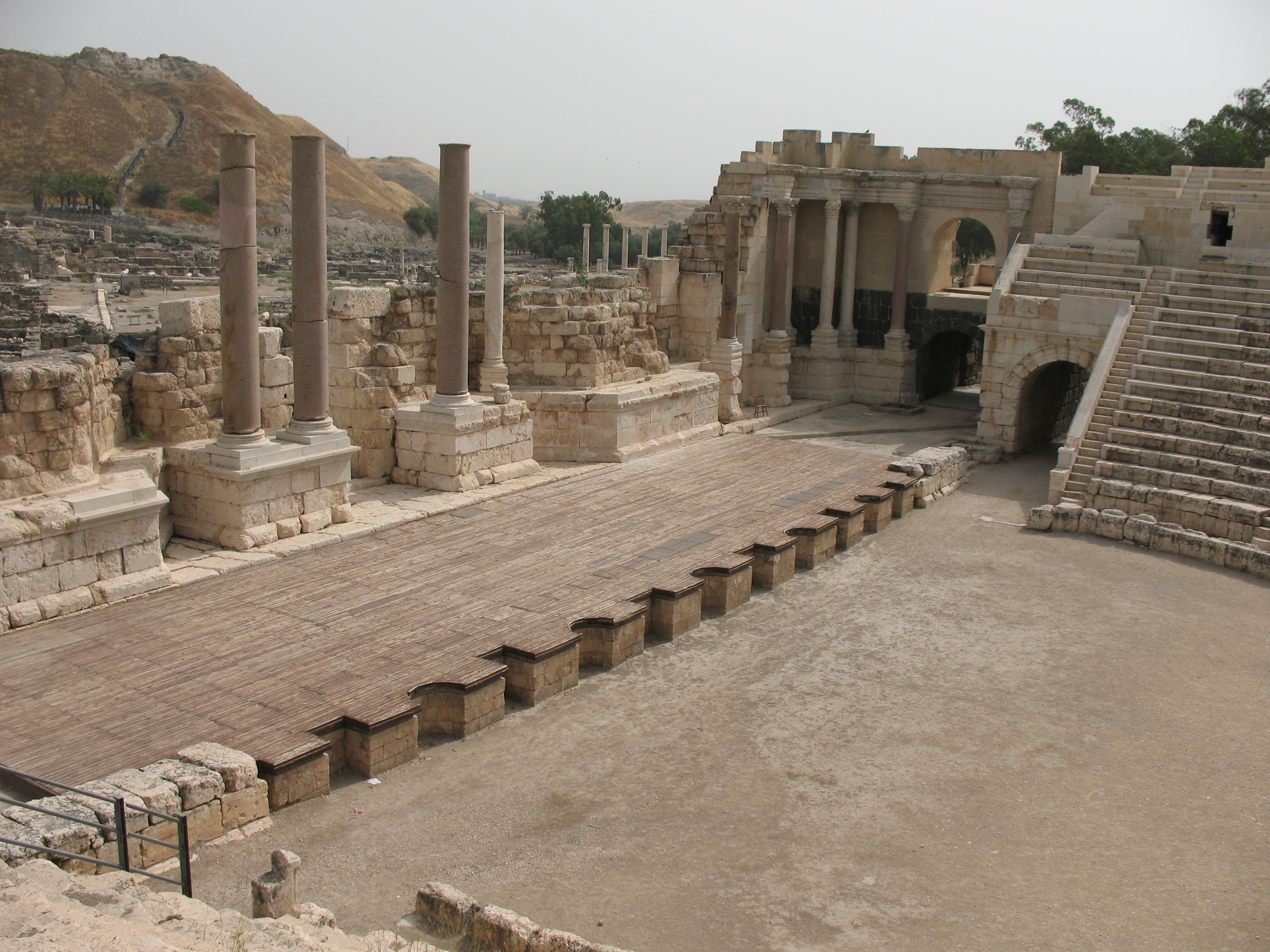
Beit She'an ruins

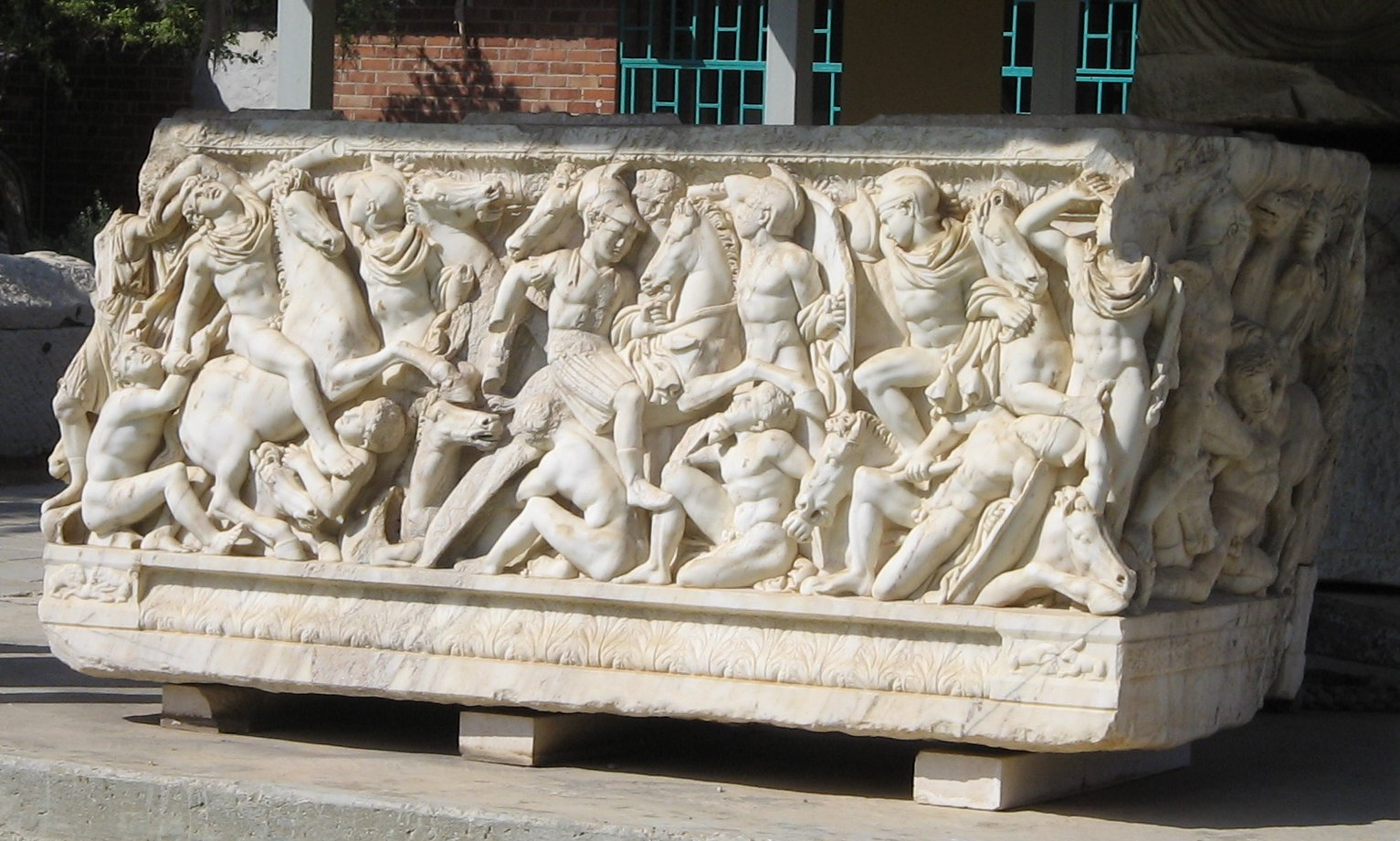
Hellenistic Sarcophagus unearthed in Ashkelon

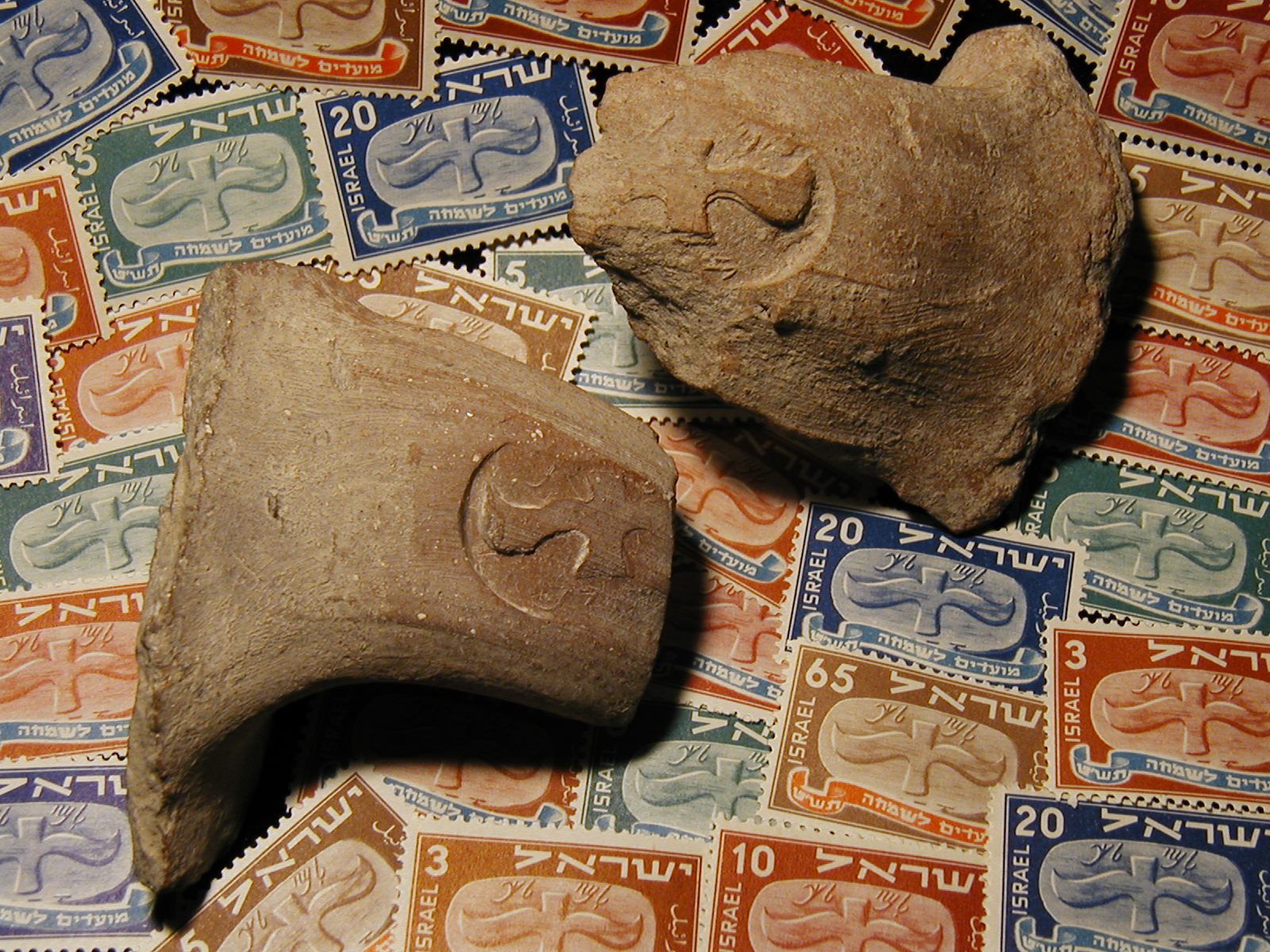
LMLK seals with Israeli postage stamps commemorating them

The archaeology of Israel is the study of the archaeology of the present-day Israel, stretching from prehistory through three millennia of documented history. The ancient Land of Israel was a geographical bridge between the political and cultural centers of Mesopotamia and Egypt.

Despite the importance of the country to three major religions, serious study of the country history only began in the 15th century. Although he never travelled to the Levant, or even left the Netherlands, the first major work on the antiquities of Israel is considered to be Adriaan Reland's Antiquitates Sacrae veterum Hebraeorum, published in 1708. Edward Robinson, an American theologian who visited the country in 1838, published its first topographical studies. Lady Hester Stanhope performed the first modern excavation at Ashkelon in 1815. A Frenchman, Louis Felicien de Saucy, embarked on early "modern" excavations in 1850.

Today, in Israel, there are some 30,000 sites of antiquity, the vast majority of which have never been excavated.

In discussing the state of archaeology in Israel in his time, David Ussishkin commented in the 1980s that the designation "Israeli archaeology" no longer represents a single uniform methodological approach; rather, its scope covers numerous different archaeological schools, disciplines, concepts, and methods currently in existence in Israel.

== Archaeological time periods ==
=== Paleolithic period ===
==== Lower Paleolithic ====
The beginning of the Lower Paleolithic in Israel is defined by the earliest archaeological finds available. Occasionally, when new, more ancient sites are discovered, the boundaries of this period are redefined. Currently the most ancient site in Israel, and one of the earliest outside of Africa, is Ubeidiya, in the Jordan Rift Valley. Its age is estimated to be between 1.55 and 1.2 million years BP. Many stone tools of the Acheulean culture have been discovered there. Among the other sites from this period is the site at Daughters of Jacob Bridge, which has been dated to 790,000 BP, using paleomagnetism. Some of the earliest evidence of the use of fire and wooden tools has been discovered on this site.

It is estimated that the people who left the remains discovered on the two sites mentioned belonged to the species Homo erectus, although the human fossils found were too few and incomplete to make a positive identification possible. An additional site from the early Lower Paleolithic is the Ruhama Swamp in the northern Negev, which contains remains from the Oldowan culture.

Most of the sites from this period belong to the Acheulean culture, and on many of them remains of elephant bones have been found, together with tools made of flint and basalt. Additional important sites are Revadim, Tabun Cave in Nahal Me'arot Nature Reserve, a site near the city of Holon, and a site located near kibbutz Evron.

At the end of the Lower Paleolithic, between 400,000 and 250,000 BP, the Acheulo-Yabrudian complex emerged. The site near Lake Ram, in the Golan Heights, where the Venus of Berekhat Ram was discovered, probably belongs to this cultural horizon. This statue is considered, by some, to be the earliest artistic representation of the human form. One of the human fossils from this period is the Galilee Skull, part of a skull discovered by Francis Turville-Petre in Mugharet el-Zuttiyeh, in Nahal Amud, which is considered today to be the skull of a Homo heidelbergensis or of an early Homo sapiens. Notable Acheulo-Yabrudian sites are Tabun Cave and Qesem Cave.

In December 2020, archaeologists from the University of Haifa announced the discovery at the Tabun Cave at the Mount Carmel site of the oldest known tool used for grinding or scraping, dating back about 350,000 years. According to researchers, this cobble belongs to the Acheulo-Yabrudian complex from the late Lower Paleolithic and was used by hominids for abrading surfaces.

In February 2022, archaeologists from the Israel Antiquities Authority, led by Professor Ella Been, announced the discovery of a 1.5-million-year-old complete Hominini vertebra. According to the researchers, the fossilized bone belonging to a juvenile between the ages of 6–12 is the oldest evidence of ancient Hominini in the Middle East. This latest discovery has shed new light on the story of prehistoric migration. The lower lumbar vertebra, dated to the Early Pleistocene, differs in size and shape from a 1.8-million-year-old skull unearthed at Dmanisi in the Republic of Georgia. After this discovery, co-author Dr Omry Barzilai concluded that different human species produced the two artifacts.

==== Middle Paleolithic ====
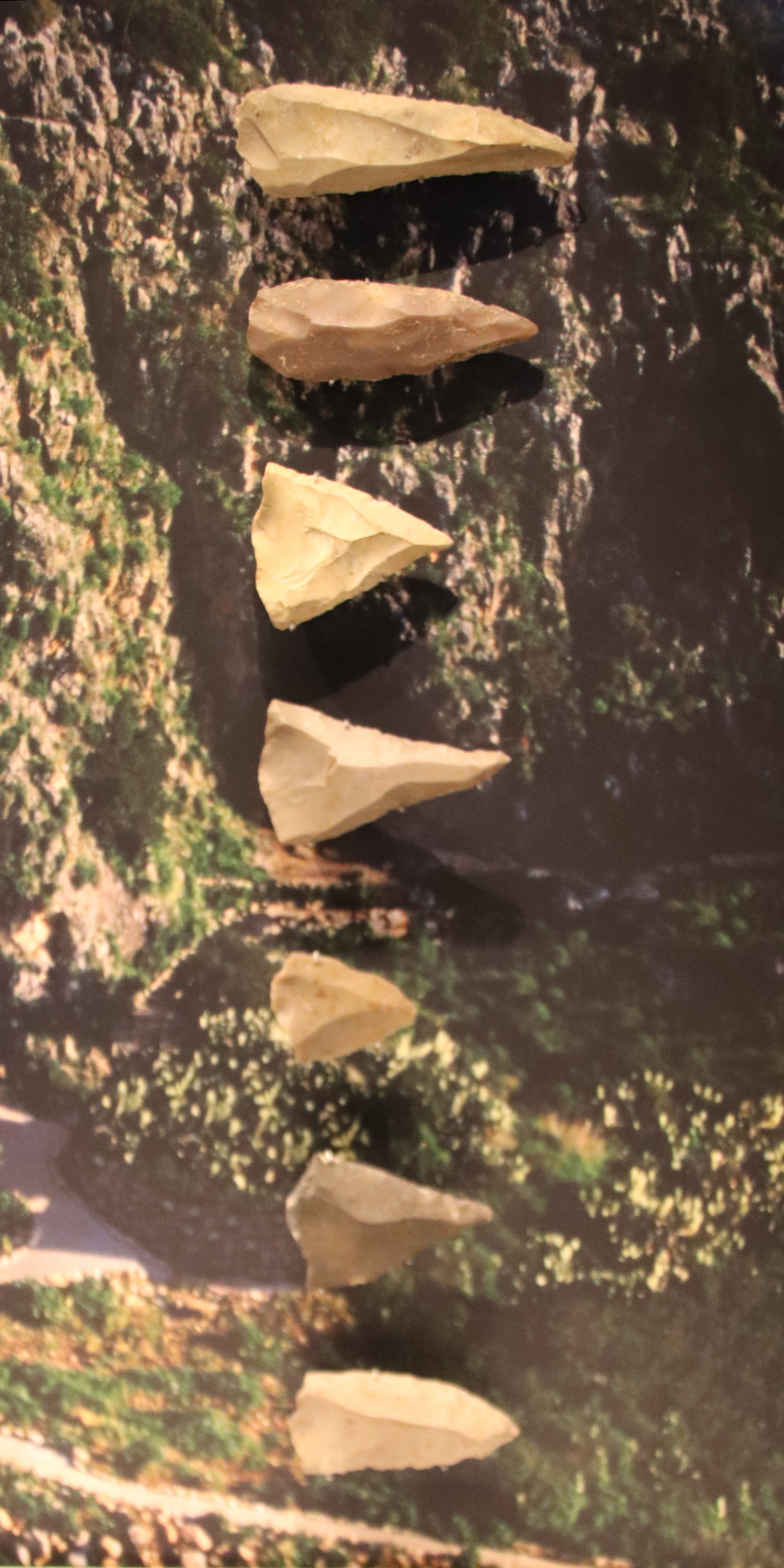
Mousterian Culture, stone spearheads, 250,000–50,000. Israel Museum

This period has been dated to the years 250,000–45,000 BP. Fossils of Neanderthals and of Homo sapiens from this period have been discovered in Israel. The Homo sapiens remains found in Israel are the oldest anatomically modern human remains discovered in this region of the continent of Africa. It is yet unclear whether Neanderthals and Homo sapiens populations coexisted side by side, in this area, or replaced each other as the global climate shifted, as was common during the Pleistocene. Both used the same style of stone tools, identified as the Mousterian culture. Remains of this culture have been discovered all over Israel, in dozens of cave sites and open sites.

Judging by the size and content of these sites it seems the population living in the area of today's Israel in that period was small. Groups were small and they subsisted on hunting, consuming the carcasses of dead animals and gathering plants.

Their preferred game was the Mountain gazelle, the Persian fallow deer, and the Aurochs. In cave sites that had been used as seasonal dwellings in that period dozens of buried human skeletons have been uncovered. The most famous ancient Homo sapiens skeletons are the ones discovered in Es Skhul cave in Nahal Me'arot and in Me'arat Kedumim (Kedumim Cave) in Lower Galilee; the most notable Neanderthal skeletons are from Tabun Cave in Nahal Me'arot, from Kebara Cave, near Zikhron Ya'akov, and from Amud Cave in Nahal Amud. Other important sites are Misliyah Cave and Sephunim Cave in the Carmel and several open sites in the Golan, in the Negev, and in the Coastal plain.

In February 2021, archaeologists from the Hebrew University of Jerusalem and Haifa University announced the discovery of six lines engraved on a 120,000-year-old aurochs bone near the city of Ramle in the open-air Middle Paleolithic site of Nesher Ramla. According to archaeologist Yossi Zaidner, this finding was definitely the oldest in the Levant. Three-dimensional imaging and microscopic analysis were used to examine the bone. The six lines ranged in length from 38 to 42 millimeters.

==== Upper Paleolithic ====
This period in Israel has been dated to between 45,000 BCE and 20,500 BCE, and its sites are associated with two cultural horizons: the Ahmarian culture and the Levantine Aurignacian culture. Some technological advancements were made in this period, including the introduction of new techniques for manufacturing flint tools, the invention of the bow and arrow, and the manufacturing of stone tools intended for grinding food and preparing dyes. Humans began making tools from animal bones and the use of seashells for decoration became widespread.

Parts of skeletons were discovered in various sites, but no cemeteries from this period were ever found. It seems that during this era the Neanderthals disappeared from Israel, as they were going extinct throughout the Middle East and Europe at the time.

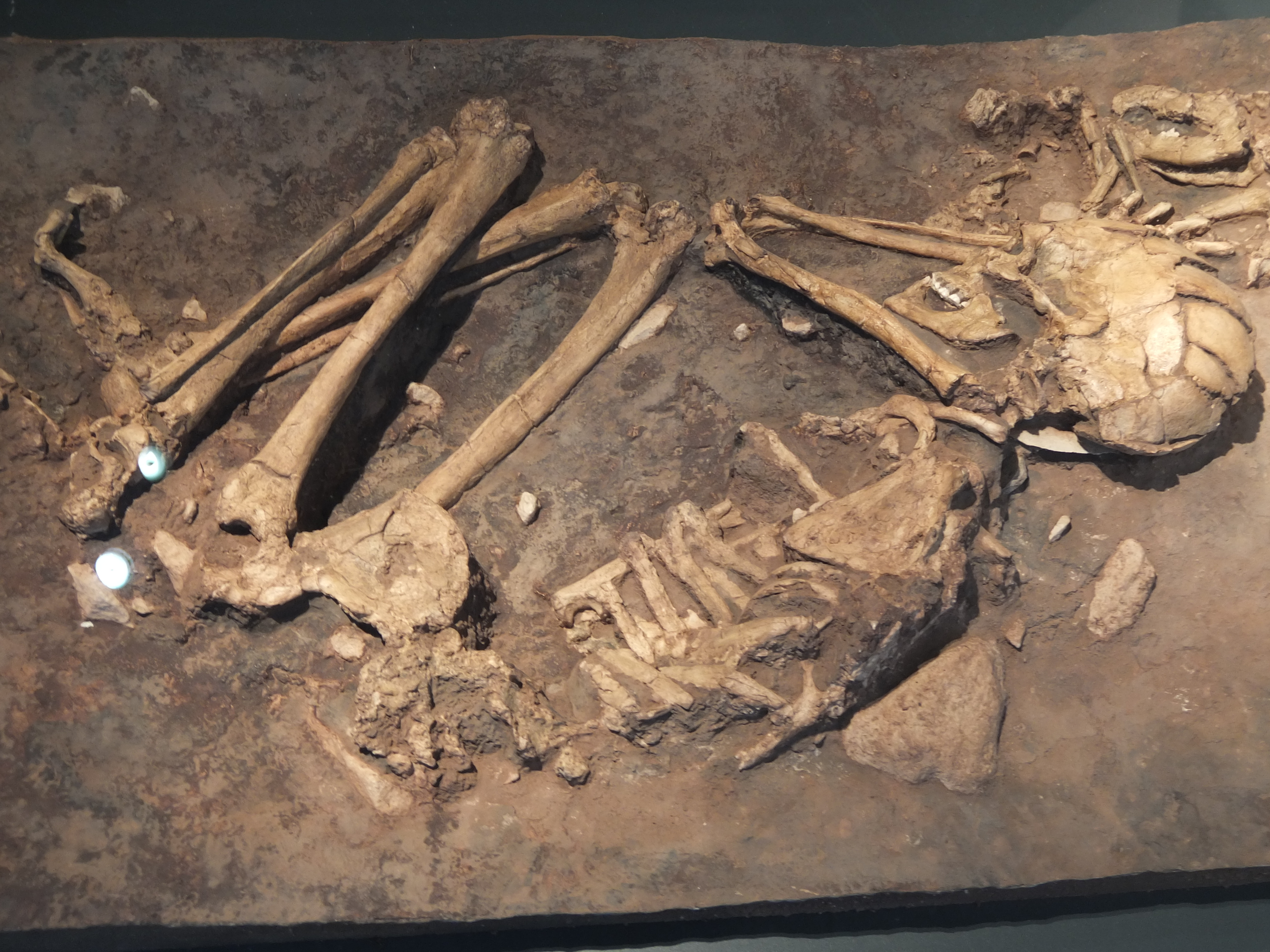
Skeleton of woman from paleolithic period

=== Epipaleolithic period ===
In this era, bridging between the mobile bands of hunter-gatherers of the Paleolithic and the agricultural villages of the Neolithic, three different cultures existed in Israel: the Kebaran culture, dated to 18,000–12,500 BCE, the Kebaran Geometric culture, dated to 12,500–10,500 BCE, and the Natufian culture, dated to 12,500–9,500 BCE.

In March 2026, a study published in Science Advances revealed that children and adults were shaping clay ornaments in the Levant as early as 15,000 years ago. Researchers analyzed 142 beads and pendants found at four Natufian sites in modern-day Israel: el-Wad, Nahal Oren, Hayonim, and Eynan-Mallaha. These objects were hand-formed from unbaked clay into various shapes, including cylinders and discs. Many of the beads were coated in red ochre using a technique called engobe (applying a thin layer of liquid clay).

=== Neolithic period ===
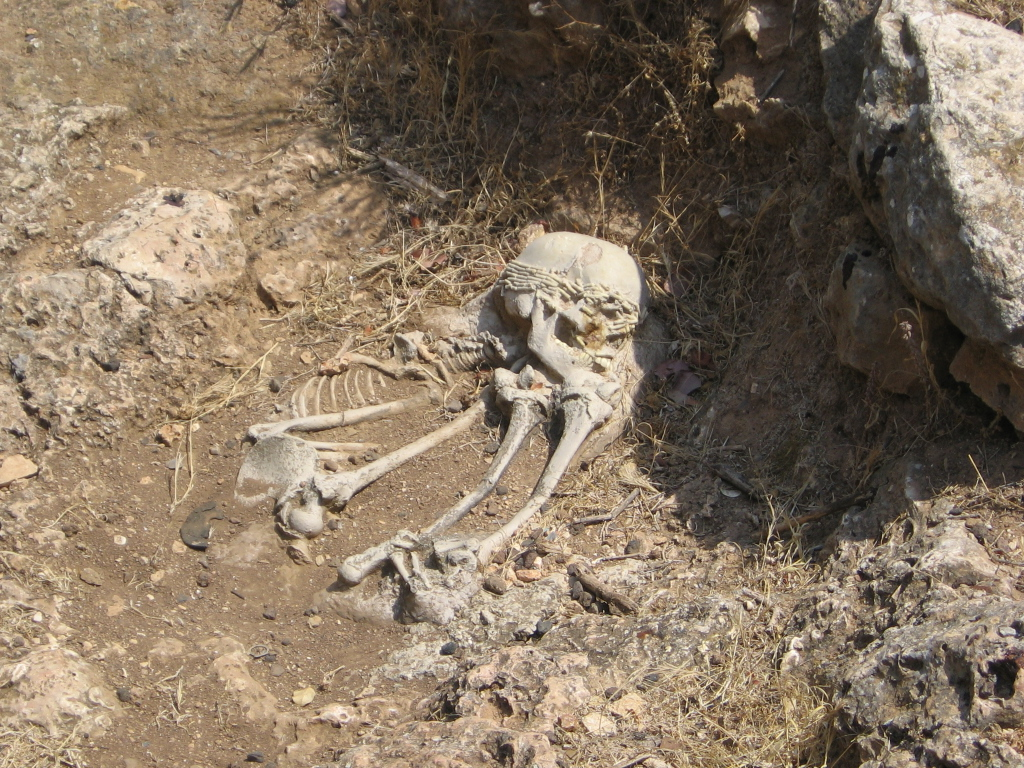
Natufian burial, Nahal Me'arot stream, Israel

The Neolithic period appears to have begun when the peoples of the Natufian culture, which spread across present-day Syria, Israel and Lebanon, began to practice agriculture. This Neolithic Revolution has been linked to the cold period known as the Younger Dryas. This agriculture in the Levant is the earliest known to have been practiced. The Neolithic period in this region is dated 8500–4300 BCE and the Chalcolithic 4300–3300 BCE. The term "Natufian" was coined by Dorothy Garrod in 1928, after identifying an archaeological sequence at Wadi al-Natuf which included a Late Levallois-Mousterian layer and a stratified deposit, the Mesolithic of Palestine, which contained charcoal traces and a microlithic flint tool industry. Natufian sites in Israel include Ain Mallaha, el-Wad, Ein Gev, Hayonim cave, Nahal Oren and Kfar HaHoresh.

=== Archaeological remains ===
In July 2022, archaeologists from the Israel Antiquities Authority announced the discovery of an 8,000-year-old "Mother Goddess" figurine at Sha'ar HaGolan archaeological site. Anna Eirikh-Rose, co-director of the excavation reported that the 20-centimeter long figurine covered by a bracelet with a red bottom was found broken into 2 pieces. It was sculpted in a sitting position with big hips, a unique pointed hat, what are known as "coffee-bean" eyes, and a big nose.

In June 2024, the Israel Antiquities Authority (IAA) recently announced the discovery of a well-preserved shipwreck dating back 3,300 years. The wreck, found about 90 kilometers (55 miles) off Israel's Mediterranean coast at a depth of 1,800 meters (1.1 miles), contained hundreds of intact Canaanite jugs used for transporting wine, food oils, fruit, and other goods across the Mediterranean. The wooden ship was discovered by Energean, a natural gas company operating several deep-sea natural gas fields in Israel's territorial waters.

=== Chalcolithic period ===
==== Definition ====
Understanding of the Chalcolithic period in Israel and in the Levant is still far from perfect. It seems that Chalcolithic cultures appeared in the northern Jordan Valley around 4,800 BCE, and in the southern parts of this valley, and, particularly, in Teleilat el-Ghassul, around 4,500 BCE. Though no direct evidence to this effect is currently available, Chalcolithic civilizations may have spread from northern Israel to the south over several centuries during the first half of the 5th millennium BCE. Judging by evidence from the material culture, there seems to be no direct link between the Late Neolithic cultures and the early Chalcolithic cultures that replaced them in this region. The Chalcolithic period ended in Israel around 3,500 BCE with the rise of the Early Bronze civilization.

Chief among the Chalcolithic cultures of the Levant is the Ghassulian culture of the mid to late Chalcolithic. It might have been preceded by the Bsorian culture. The Ghassulian culture itself is made of several subcultures, one of which is the Beersheba culture.

==== Subsistence ====
Hundreds of Chalcolithic sites have been discovered in Israel. Their subsistence was based on farming crops: chiefly wheat, barley and lentils, and on livestock: sheep, goats, pigs and cattle. The livestock was also used for producing wool and dairy products. This is evident from the many butter churns, made of clay, and also from the large number of animal figurines that have been discovered on Chalcolithic sites. People of the Chalcolithic period were also the first in Israel to grow cultivated fruit-bearing trees, such as date palms, olive trees and pomegranates.

==== Industry and material culture ====
The Ghassulians were the first in the area to smelt and work copper. Settlements of the Beersheba culture, a late Ghassulian subculture, specialized in different types of industry. Bir Abu Matar produced copper and copper tools, artifacts and jewelry. Copper ore, imported from Wadi Feynan or from Timna, was ground and then cooked in ovens. It was then smelted in special furnaces made of compacted earth mixed with straw. The molten metal was collected in special clay bowls and cast into earthen molds that were shattered after the metal had cooled. The people of Bir Tzafad specialized in ivory carving.

People of the Chalcolithic era also produced a multitude of stone (flint) tools, chief among which were fan scrapers, used mainly for working leather. Bone tools - such as picks, needles, combs and sickles - were also in use.

==== Ghassulian art ====
Elaborate, multicolored, wall paintings, done on plaster, that were probably associated with Ghassulian religious practices, were discovered in the later Chalcolithic layers of Teleilat el-Ghassul, the layers associated with the Ghassulian culture. The painters employed elaborate techniques, including the use of rulers to draw straight lines, and produced works of high accuracy. Periodically, a new layer of plaster would be applied to the wall and covered in fresh paintings. Over 20 such layers were discovered on the walls of one of the houses.

The Ghassulians also produced ivory statuettes, often of naked women or bearded men, or using other motifs, for instance, birds. These statuettes had holes at the top and were probably meant to be suspended by a string. They include motifs found in artifacts from pre-dynastic Upper Egypt (Amratian and Gerzean cultures).

==== Trade ====
People of the Chalcolithic engaged in extensive trade. Copper ore for the Ghassulian copper industry was imported from Timna or from Wadi Feynan, in today's Jordan. Basalt artifacts (sets of large, finely crafted, basalt bowls) that were probably used in religious rituals were imported from the north, from the Golan or from the Houran. These sets of exquisite artifacts also indicate an early phase of social stratification in Chalcolithic societies, since they were only found in several of the houses, whereas in others similar sets made of clay were discovered. Ivory for making ivory statuettes was brought from Africa, marine shells - from the Mediterranean coastline, from the Red Sea and from the Nile Valley. The settlements also traded with each other.

==== Archaeological remains ====
In March 2021, archaeologists from the Israel Antiquities Authority announced the discovery of the partially mummified 6000-year-old remains of a child in the Cave of Horror. The skeleton, probably a girl aged between 6 and 12 under two flat stones in a shallow pit grave was revealed with the help of CT (CAT) scan. The burial dates to the Chalcolithic period. The child had been buried in a fetal position and covered with a cloth resembling a small blanket, wrapped around its head and chest, but not its feet. The burial was found along with 1,600-year-old Dead Sea scrolls. Fragments were Greek translations of the books of Nahum and Zechariah from the Book of the 12 Minor Prophets. The only text written in Hebrew was the name of God.

=== Bronze Age / Canaanite period ===
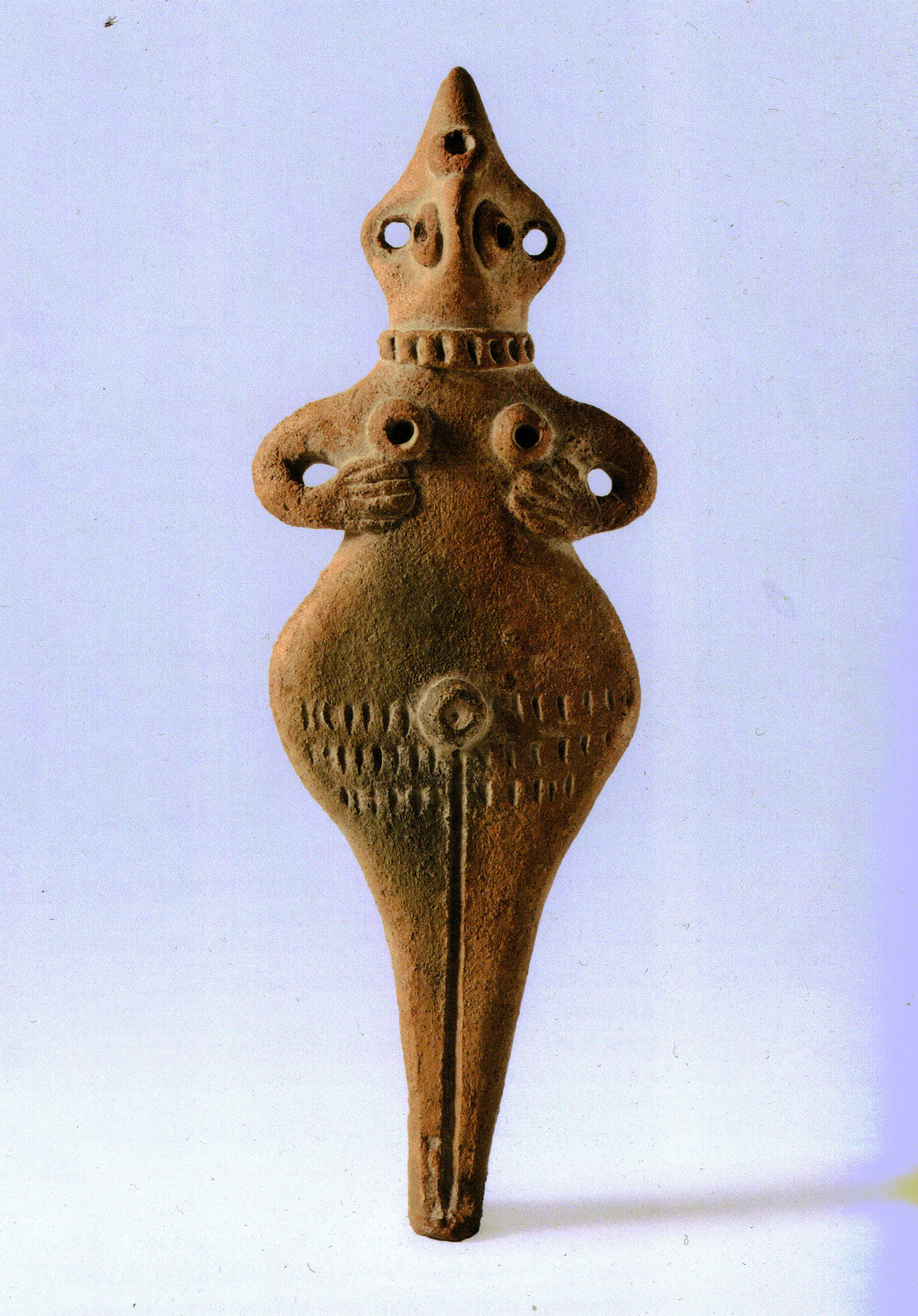
Middle Bronze Age terracotta figurine, Israel National Maritime Museum

The Bronze Age is the period 3300–1200 BCE when objects made of bronze were in use. Many writers have linked the history of the Levant from the Bronze Age onwards to events described in the Bible. The Bronze Age and Iron Age together are sometimes called the "Biblical period". The periods of the Bronze Age include the following:

- Early Bronze Age I (EB I) 3330–3050 BCE
- Early Bronze Age II–III (EB II–III) 3050–2300 BCE
- Early Bronze Age IV/Middle Bronze Age I (EB IV/MB I) 2300–2000 BCE
- Middle Bronze Age IIA (MB IIA) 2000–1750 BCE
- Middle Bronze Age IIB (MB IIB) 1800–1550 BCE
- Late Bronze Age I–II (LB I–II) 1550–1200 BCE

The Late Bronze Age is characterized by individual city-states, which from time to time were dominated by Egypt until the last invasion by Merneptah in 1207 BCE. The Amarna Letters are an example of a specific period during the Late Bronze Age when the vassal kings of the Levant corresponded with their overlords in Egypt.

==== Archaeological remains ====
In February 2023, the remains of two elite brothers buried with Cypriot pottery, food and other valuable possessions were found in a Bronze Age tomb in Tel Megiddo. Bioarchaeologists identified the early evidence of a Bronze Age cranial surgery called trepanation in one of the brothers. The study published in PLOS One reports that the younger brother died in his teens or early twenties, most likely from an infectious illness like leprosy or tuberculosis. The older brother, who died immediately after the surgery, had angular notched trepanation and was thought to be between the ages of 20 and 40. A 30-millimeter (1.2-inch) square-shaped hole was created on the frontal bone of the skull after his scalp was cut with a sharp instrument with a bevelled-edge.

=== Iron Age / Israelite period ===
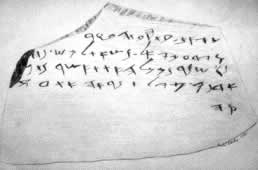
Lachish letters

The Iron Age in the Levant begins in about 1200 BCE, following the Late Bronze Age Collapse, when iron tools came into use. It is also known as the Israelite period. In this period both the archaeological evidence and the narrative evidence from the Bible become richer and much writing has attempted to make links between them. A chronology includes:

- Iron Age I (IA I) 1200–1000 BCE
- Iron Age IIA (IA IIA) 1000–925 BCE
- Iron Age IIB-C (IA IIB-C) 925–586 BCE
- Iron Age III 586–539 BCE (Neo-Babylonian period)

The traditional view, personified in such archaeologists as Albright and Wright, faithfully accepted the biblical events as history, but has since been questioned by "Biblical minimalists" such as Niels Peter Lemche, Thomas L. Thompson and Philip R. Davies. Israel Finkelstein suggests that the empire of David and Solomon (United Monarchy) never existed and Judah was not in a position to support an extended state until the start of the 8th century. Finkelstein accepts the existence of King David and Solomon but doubts their chronology, significance and influence as described in the Bible. Without claiming that everything in the Bible is historically accurate, some non-supernatural story elements appear to correspond with physical artifacts and other archaeological findings. Inscriptions such as the Tel Dan Stele and the Mesha Stele can be traced to a non-Hebrew cultural origin.

==== Origins of the Ancient Israelites – the Tel Aviv School ====
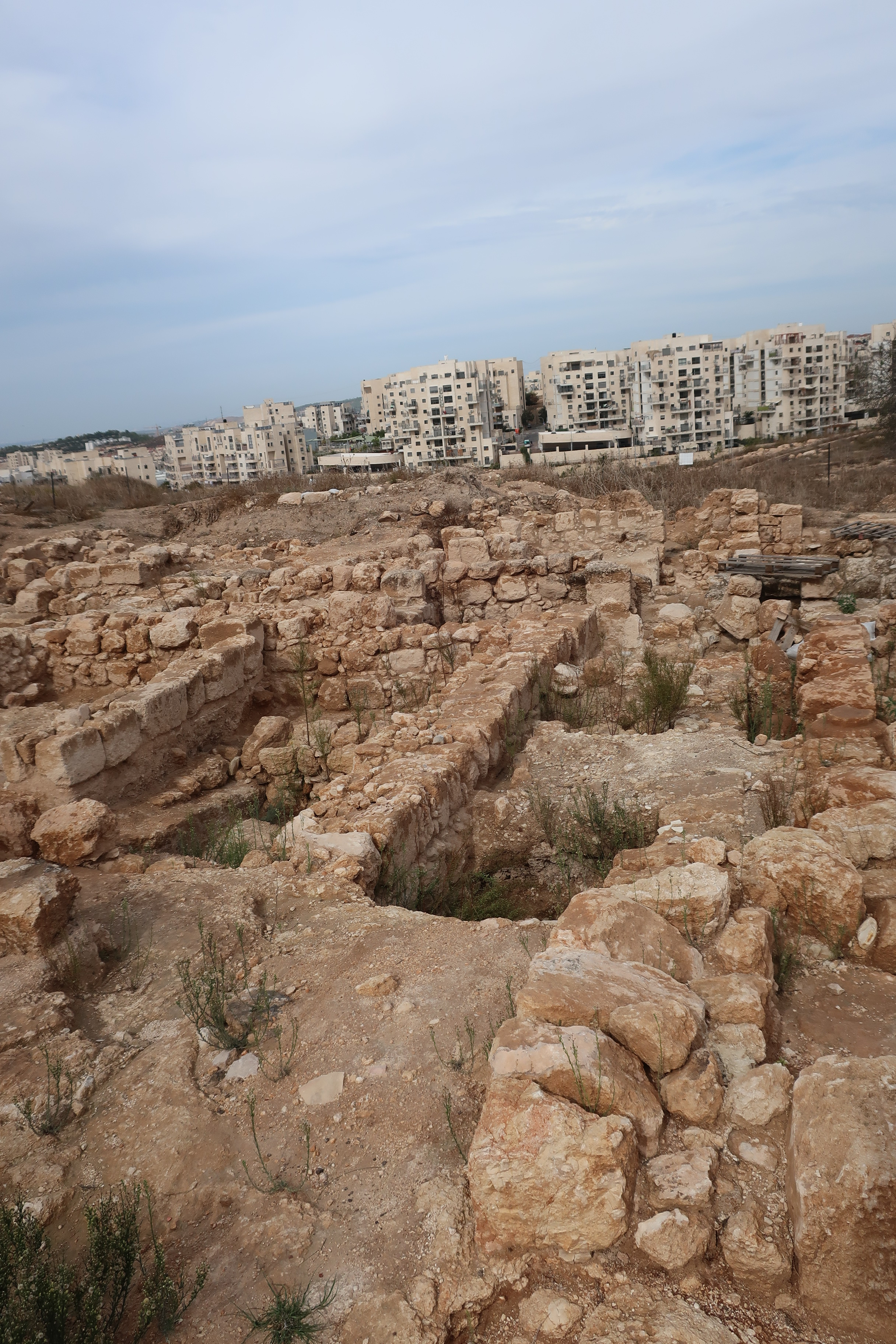
Contrast of old and new – Beit Shemesh

Following the collapse of many cities and civilizations in the eastern Mediterranean Basin at the end of the Bronze Age, certain local nomadic groups in eastern Canaan began settling in the mountainous regions of that land (the mountain ranges on both sides of the Jordan River, of which the western part is known today as the West Bank). In this period the Sea Peoples invaded the countries along the eastern shores of the Mediterranean, creating the Philistine city states along the seacoast of southwestern Canaan. Egypt lost its control of the land in the 12th century BCE – the exact date is currently being disputed, and this issue is closely linked to the Low Chronology / High Chronology dispute.

According to Israel Finkelstein, this tendency of nomads to settle down, or of sedentary populations to become nomadic, when circumstances make it worth their while, is typical of many Mid-Eastern populations which retain the knowledge of both ways of life and can switch between them fairly easily. This happens on a small scale, but can also happen on a large scale, when regional political and economical circumstances change dramatically. According to Finkelstein, this process of settlement on a large scale in the mountain-ranges of Canaan had already happened twice before, in the Bronze Age, during periods when the urban civilization was in decline. The numbers of settlers were smaller in those previous two instances, and the settlement-systems they created ended up dissipating instead of coalescing into more mature political entities, as was the case with the settlers of the early Iron Age.

In the early stages of this process, settlements had the form of nomadic tent-camps: a ring of stone houses surrounding an inner yard where the livestock was kept. Gradually, as the settlement evolved, that space was filled up with houses. The composition of animal bones found in successive archaeological layers also displays change over time, reflecting the change in lifestyle – nomadic societies raise many sheep and goats and very little cattle. As the settlement process progressed, the percentage of cattle bones found in animal bone deposits increased dramatically. Another characteristic of the early Israelite settlements is the absence of pig bones in excavated sites, which seems to be the earliest evidence of the development of an "Israelite national identity", though it is, so far, not quite conclusive.

At the height of this process, in the 10th century BCE, the population of the areas that would become the early Kingdom of Israel and the early Kingdom of Judea (before these kingdoms began spreading into the surrounding lowlands) numbered around 45,000. In the 11th century BCE Shiloh probably served as a religious center and might have held some political power in the region. In the mid to late 10th century BCE an early Israelite state formation emerged (possibly the one referred to in the Old Testament as the Kingdom of Saul).

It has been suggested by Finkelstein that this early Israelite state—and not David's 'unified kingdom', which he sees as a "literary construct"—had been the target of the campaign of Shoshenq I to Canaan, in the middle of the second half of the 10th century BCE. There is evidence of a large scale abandonment of settlements in the heartland of the Kingdom of Saul, as described in the Old Testament, around that time—in the land of the Tribe of Benjamin, just north of Judah, the area of Gibeah. This attack by Shoshenq I on the Israelite kingdom was, most likely, a response to this kingdom's attempts to expand into the lowlands of Canaan (as evidenced by a series of destruction events of Canaanite cities in the north of Israel around that time), and a part of this Pharaoh's effort to take control over Canaan.

The Kingdom of Judah was relatively small—maybe 5,000 people in the 10th century BCE—and had been a vassal of Israel at least since the early 9th century, when the powerful Omride dynasty had taken over that kingdom, and until Israel's destruction by the Neo-Assyrian Empire in the late 8th century BCE. The Old Testament is mostly a Judean creation, although it incorporates many traditions (and, possibly, texts) from the Kingdom of Israel. As such, it describes the history of these two kingdoms, in the Iron Age, from a strictly Judean theological perspective and its historical account is biased, though it becomes relatively reliable from the 9th century onward.

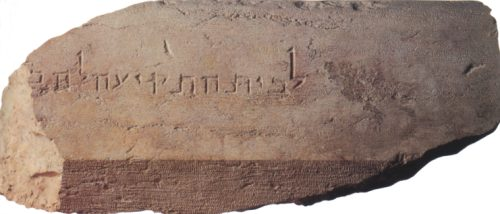
The Trumpeting Place inscription stone with Hebrew text, excavated at the southern foot of the Temple Mount

=== The Kingdoms of Israel and Judah ===
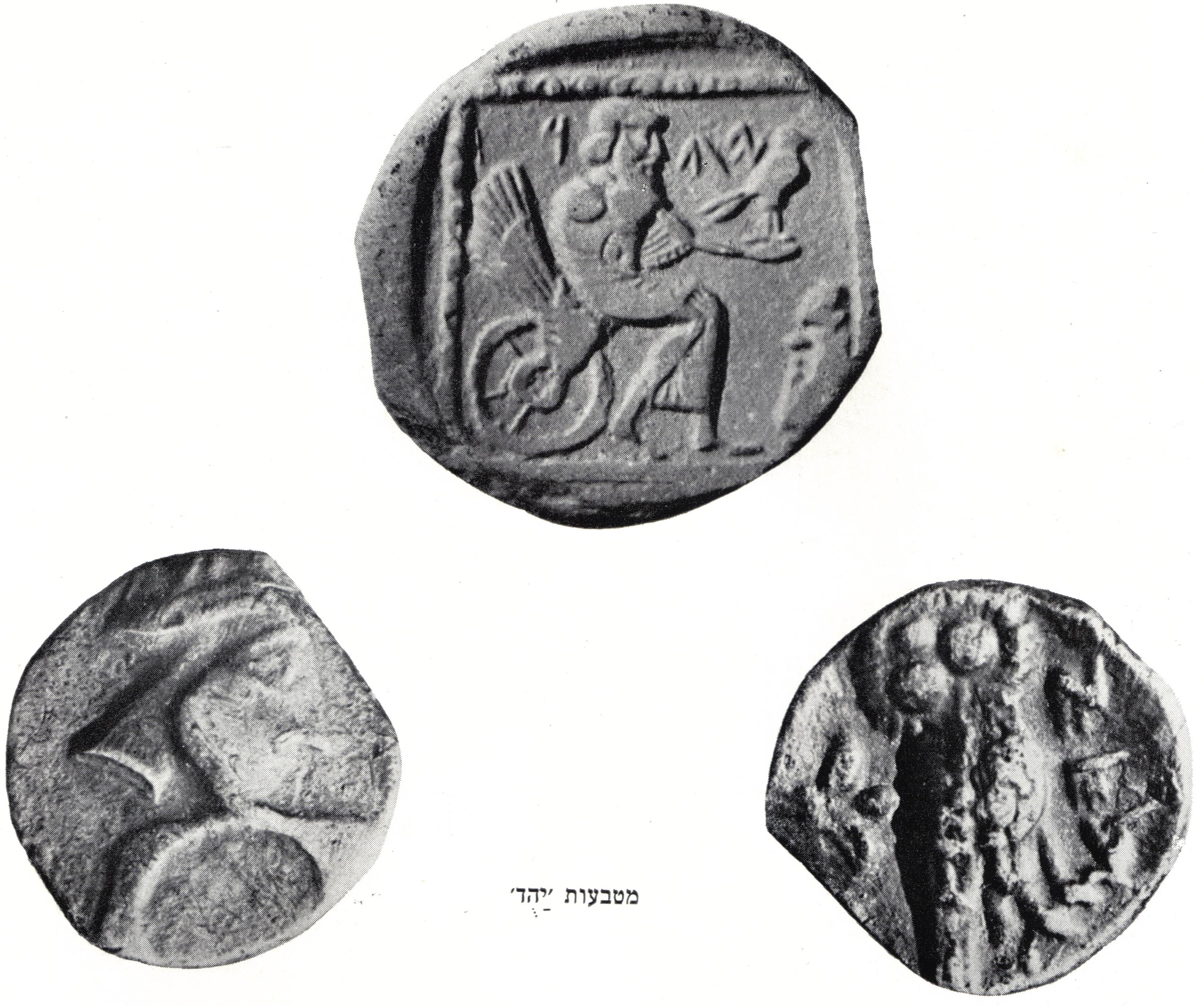
Yehud coins bearing the inscription 'YHD' (יהד), from the Persian period

=== Persian period ===
The Persian period of Israel's history lasted from the conquest of the former Kingdom of Judah by King Cyrus in 539 B.C.E. until the conquest of the region by Alexander the Great in 332 B.C.E. The Persians established the province of Yehud in the region that was once the Kingdom of Judah, however the exact time period when formal administration began is disputed. Ephraim Stern lists three possibilities: An early date, with the province being established by the end of the sixth century B.C.E.; a later date, with the province being established in the mid-fifth century B.C.E.; and a middle position, with the province being established early and only functioning properly in the mid-fifth century B.C.E. The Persian period has not left as much of an archaeological trace as other periods, in large part due to the abandonment of many sites after the Persian period, causing many strata to be exposed and, consequently, eroded.

The population of Yehud at this time was originally thought to be larger, but modern estimations by Israel Finkelstein place the population at 12,000 in the beginning of the period, only growing to 40,000 in the Hellenistic period; with Finkelstein estimating the population of Jerusalem to be only about 400 in the fifth century B.C.E. Oded Lipschits rejects this view, calling it ultra-minimalist and arguing that the evidence points to a more moderate population in Jerusalem of 1,000-1,250.

East of Rosh ha-'Ayin, Archaeologists believe they may have uncovered an administrative building with architecture resembling that of official residences of the Neo-Assyrian, Neo-Bablyonian, and Persian periods. The pottery found within, including attic bowls, storage jars, and a closed wheel-made oil lamp, comfortably date the building as being inhabited from the late Persian period to the early Hellenistic period, possibly as an attempt to strengthen Persian administrative presence in response to the Egyptian Rebellion from 404-400 BCE.

A network of fortresses existed in Yehud during the Persian period. One example is the small fortress of Ḥurvat ՙEres in the Judean Foothills, north of Kiryat Ye'arim. Although the finds there were meagre, archaeologists concluded that the pottery types indicate the fort was likely used for a short time in the second half of the fourth century B.C.E. A recovered bronze fibula and nails also match with the date suggested by the pottery, placing it very late in the Persian period.

Although Yehud was a Persian province, Greek influence was heavily felt throughout the Persian period. Along the Levantine coast, Greek trading posts were present, bringing Greek imports from the mainland. At Sepphoris, archaeologists may have identified a Greek lookout post for Greek traders due to the heavy presence of Attic pottery, though it could also have been a Persian garrison with Greek mercenaries.

Local pottery styles appear to mainly continue the Iron Age tradition of plain, undecorated pottery. Deviating from this tradition, we do find among Persian period pottery imitations of Greek imports, mortaria used for grinding, and red or brown amphorae, thick under the neck and growing thinner toward the base until they terminate in a point.

Coinage grew in use during this period, with several cities in the Levant beginning to mint imitation Athenian coins in the fifth century B.C.E., since Athenian coinage had grown to dominate the region. Multiple city states in Yehud began minting their own coinage beginning in the fourth century B.C.E. with multiple motifs, though the most represented in the archaeological record is the motif of the eagle and lily flower.

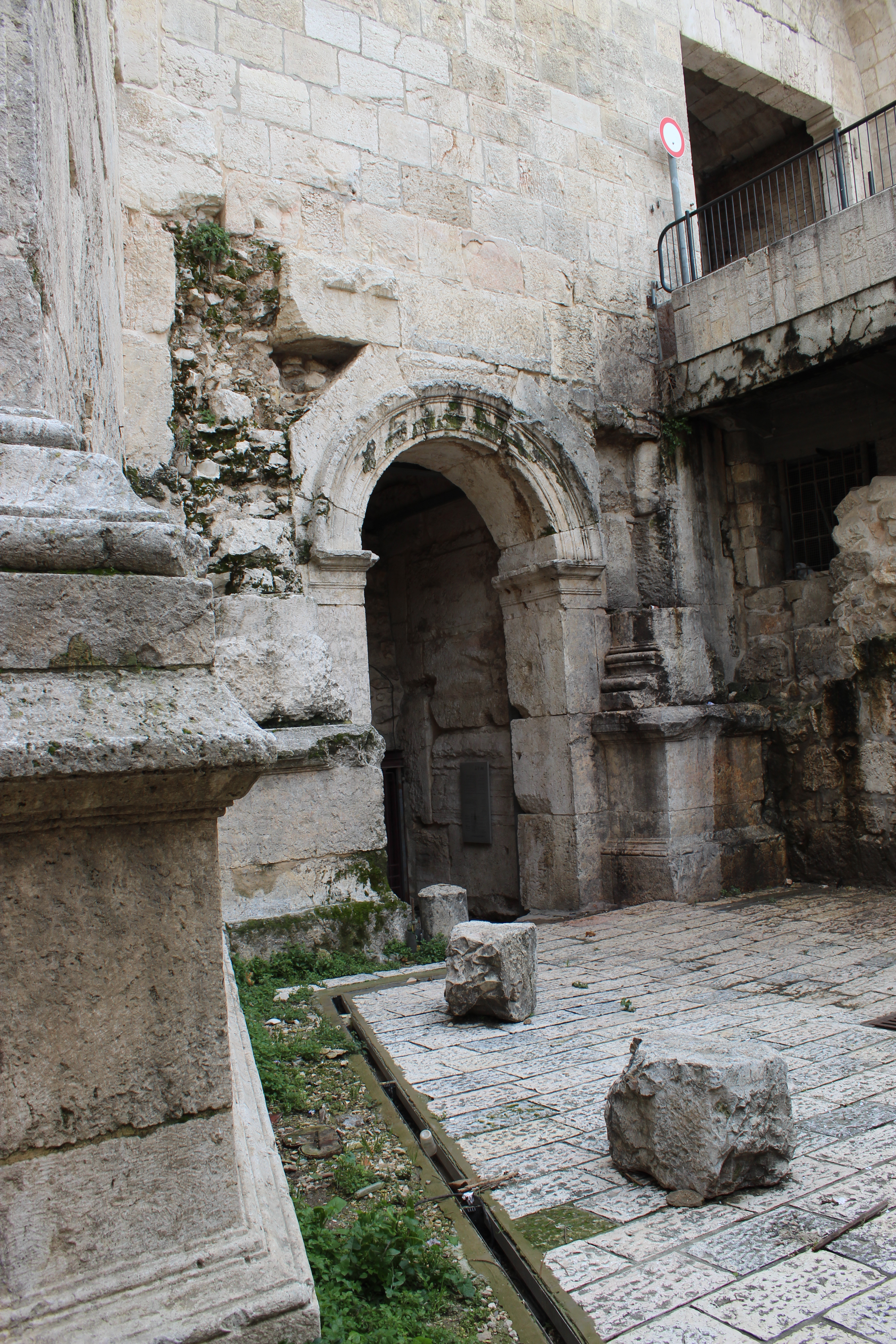
Old Roman era gate, Bab al-'Amud (Jerusalem)

=== Hellenistic period ===
Many archaeological sites in Israel have yet to be excavated, but many have been surveyed by archaeologists on behalf of the Israel Antiquities Authority. One such site dating back to the Hellenistic period is Horvat Geres (Arabic: Khirbet Jurish) near Tzur Hadassah.

=== Roman period ===
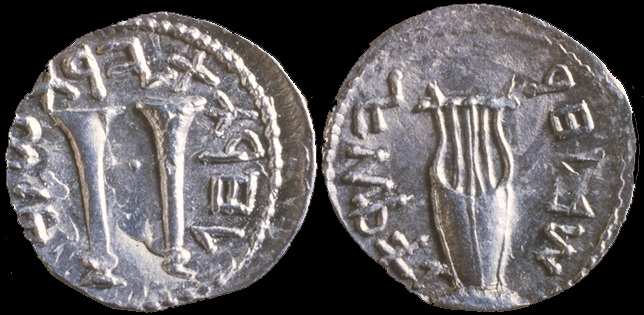
Coins from period of Bar Kokhba revolt (Roman period)

The Roman period covers the dates 63 BCE to 330 CE, from Pompey the Great's incorporation of the region into the Roman Republic until Rome's adoption of Christianity as the imperial religion. The Roman period had several stages:

- Early Roman period (including the Herodian period) 63 BCE to 70 CE
- Middle Roman period: 70–135 CE (Jewish-Roman wars period); 135–200 CE (Mishnaic period)
- Late Roman period 200–330 CE (Talmudic period)

The end of the middle Roman period marks the end of the predominantly Jewish culture of Judea, but also the beginning of Rabbinic Judaism through Rabbi Yochanan Ben Zakai in the city of Yavne. Therefore, the late Roman period is also called the Yavne Period.

Prominent archaeological sites from the Roman period include:

- Masada
- Herodium
- Caesarea Maritima

In March 2021, archaeologists announced the discovery at the Ramat Gan Safari Park in Tel Aviv of two 1,800-year-old sarcophagi, ancient stone coffins dating to the Roman period. Researchers assumed that the sarcophagi belonged to high-status people buried near Safari Park. The 6.5-foot-long coffins were crafted with limestone mined and designed with Greco-Roman symbolic discs and flower garlands.

In May 2021, archaeologists from the Israel Antiquities Authority led by Dr. Rachel Bar Nathan announced the discovery in the Ashkelon National Park of the remains of a 2,000-year-old Roman basilica complex dated to the reign of Herod the Great. The building had 3 sections, a central hall and two side parts. According to the excavators, big marble columns and capitals surrounded the main hall imported from Asia Minor in merchant ships. Remains of column capitals with plant motifs, some bearing an eagle were the symbol of the Roman Empire.

In August 2021, marine archeologists headed by Yaakov Sharvit from the Israel Antiquities Authority announced the discovery of 1,700-year-old coins weighing a total of 6 kg., dated back to the 4th century AD in Atlit. According to Sharvit, coins demonstrated that they were assembled and agglutinated because of oxidation of the metals.

In July 2022, marine archaeologists from the Israel Antiquities Authority (IAA) discovered a 1,850-year-old bronze Roman-era coin off the coast of Haifa. The coin, belonging to the reign of Emperor Antoninus Pius, depicted the Roman Moon goddess Luna (Greek Selene) and below her an astrological sign of cancer.

In 2025, archaeologists from the Israel Antiquities Authority (IAA) and the Caesarea Development Corporation discovered a Roman‑period marble sarcophagus in Caesarea dating to approximately 1,700 years ago. The sarcophagus is depicting a drinking contest between the gods Dionysus and Hercules. In the relief, Hercules is depicted reclining and visibly intoxicated, while Dionysus appears triumphant, accompanied by Maenads, satyrs, and panthers.

In August, 2025, archaeologists revealed the discovery of a rare four-line Aramaic inscription, dated to approximately 1,900 years ago, in a cave near the Ein Gedi National Park overlooking the Dead Sea. The inscription, carved in square Hebrew script and beginning with the phrase "Abba of Naburya has perished," was found on the lower part of a stalactite that also bears a First Temple–period Hebrew inscription. Alongside the inscription were four remarkably well-preserved Roman swords, including three still housed in wooden scabbards, and a coin from the Bar Kokhba Revolt suggesting the cave may have served as a refuge or weapons cache during that Jewish uprising.

In December 2025, archaeologists announced the discovery of a Second Temple–period ritual bath (mikveh) beneath the Western Wall Plaza. The Israel Antiquities Authority and The Western Wall Heritage Foundation uncovered the rock-cut mikveh sealed beneath destruction debris dated to the Roman destruction of the city in 70 CE, including burned ash and artefacts. The rectangular structure, carved into bedrock and plastered internally, measures approximately 3.05 m in length, 1.35 m in width and 1.85 m in height, with four stone steps leading down into the basin. Pottery vessels, stone tools and other items characteristic of late Second Temple period Jewish life were found within the destruction layer filling the installation.

In February 2026, the Israel Antiquities Authority (IAA) announced the discovery of a large 2,000-year-old stone vessel workshop in a cave on the eastern slopes of Mount Scopus in Jerusalem. The underground workshop dates to the Second Temple period and contains hundreds of unfinished stone vessels, production waste, and fragments. In July, a 2,000-year-old ritual bath and stone vessels were discovered at a construction site for a new neighborhood in Kiryat Gat, providing the first evidence of an ancient Jewish settlement in the transitional zone between the northern Negev and the Judean lowlands, an area where no Jewish settlements had previously been documented.

=== Byzantine period ===
The Byzantine period is dated 330–638 CE, from Rome's adoption of Christianity to the Muslim conquest of Palestine. The transition from the Roman to Byzantine period coincided with the growth of extensive imperial funding to construct Christian religious institutions in the area, often by transforming the older pagan buildings. A third of the 40,000 objects recovered annually from archaeological digs in Israel attest to the ancient Christian presence in the area. In November 2017, archaeologists discovered a 1,500-year-old Greek dedication to a church, or possibly a monastery. The inscription was discovered between two modern houses, about a mile from the coast. According to a medieval Christian Georgian calendar, a four-line Greek mosaic inscription dated back to "the 3rd indiction, year 292", which corresponds to the 6th century AD on the Gregorian calendar. Archaeologists thought they could have found remains from Azotos Paralios of the Byzantine period. In 2020, archaeologists from the Leon Recanati Institute for Maritime Studies at Haifa University uncovered the 25-meter-long ship dating back to the seventh-century. The ship was built using the "shell-first" method, containing the largest collection of Byzantine and early Islamic ceramics discovered in Israel. A team of archaeologists led by Nurit Feig of the Israel Antiquities Authority discovered the 6th-century church remains belonged to the Circassians. The excavators also revealed painted floor mosaics showing geometric shapes, blue, black, and red floral patterns. The main parameters of the discovered church are 12×36 meter.

In December 2020, archaeologists revealed the remains of 1,500 year-old Byzantine church (known as the Church of All Nations) and the foundations of a Second Temple-era ritual bath (also known as a mikveh). According to Dr. Leah and Dr. Rosario, Greek inscriptions were written on the church's floor as : "for the memory and repose of the lovers of Christ… accept the offering of your servants and give them remission of sins". In January 2021, archaeologists from Israel Antiquities Authority announced the discovery of tombstone dating back 1,400 years with Greek inscription by an employee of the Parks and Nature Authority at Nitzana National Park in the Negev desert. On the Christian woman's stone named Maria these words were written: 'Blessed Maria who lived immaculate life'. In 2021, archaeologist from Israel Antiquities Authority (IAA) led by researchers Tzachi Lang and Kojan Haku found in the village of Et Taiyiba an engraved stone from the late 5th century from the frame of an entrance door of a church, with a mosaic Greek inscription. The inscription reads "Christ born of Mary. This work of the most God-fearing and pious bishop [Theodo]sius and the miserable Th[omas] was built from the foundation. Whoever enters should pray for them." According to archaeologist Dr. Walid Atrash, Theodosius was one of the first Christian bishops and this church was the first evidence of the Byzantine church's existence in the village of Taiyiba.

In April 2021, archaeologists announced the discovery of a 1,600-year-old multicolored mosaic dated back to the Byzantine period in an industrial area. According to IAA archaeologist Elie Haddad, it was the first time that excavators revealed a colored mosaic floor in Yavne. In August 2021, Israeli archaeologists led by Yoav Arbel, have announced the discovery of Byzantine-era wine press paved with a mosaic along with an old coin minted by Emperor Heraclius. According to coin expert Robert Kool, one side of the gold depicted the emperor and his two sons, while the other side depicted the hill of Golgotha in Jerusalem. A Greek or Arabic inscription was engraved on the surface of the coins, probably with the name of the coin owner. According to Yoel Arbel, stone mortars and millstones were used to grind barley and wheat and very likely also to crush herbs and healing plants.

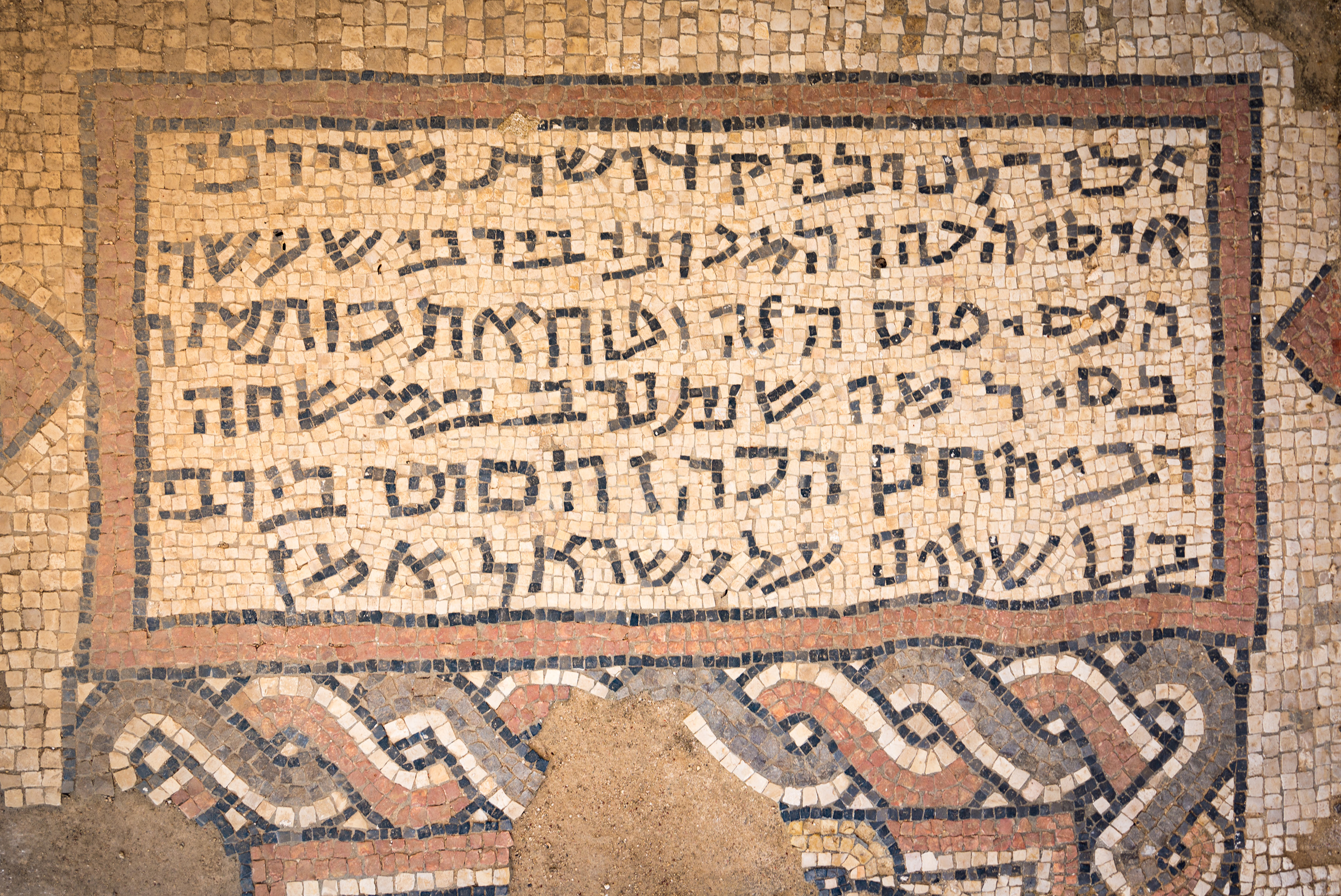
Byzantine-era mosaic from a village south of Hebron

Findings from the Byzantine period include:

- Byzantine-period church in Jerusalem hills
- Byzantine-period street in Jerusalem
- 1,400-year-old wine press

In March 2023, Israel Antiquities Authority announced the discovery of the Byzantine period mosaic with a series of floral patterns in Shoham.

In May 2025, a 1,600-year-old Byzantine mosaic from a Christian monastery near Kibbutz Urim in southern Israel was unveiled to the public for the first time. Known as the Be'er Shema mosaic, it features 55 intricately designed medallions depicting mythological figures, exotic animals, hunting scenes, and aspects of daily life, crafted from colored stones, glass, and pottery. After its discovery in 1990, the mosaic was reburied to protect it from erosion but was later conserved and relocated by the Israel Antiquities Authority to a secure location within the Merhavim Regional Council's complex.

== Notable sites ==
=== Ashkelon ===
Archaeological excavation in Ashkelon began in 1985, led by Lawrence Stager. The site contains 50 feet (15 m) of accumulated rubble from successive Canaanite, Philistine, Phoenician, Persian, Hellenistic, Roman, Byzantine, Islamic, and Crusader occupation. Major findings include shaft graves of pre-Phoenician Canaanites, a Bronze Age vault and ramparts, and a silvered bronze statuette of a bull calf, assumed to be of the Canaanite period.

=== Beit Alfa ===
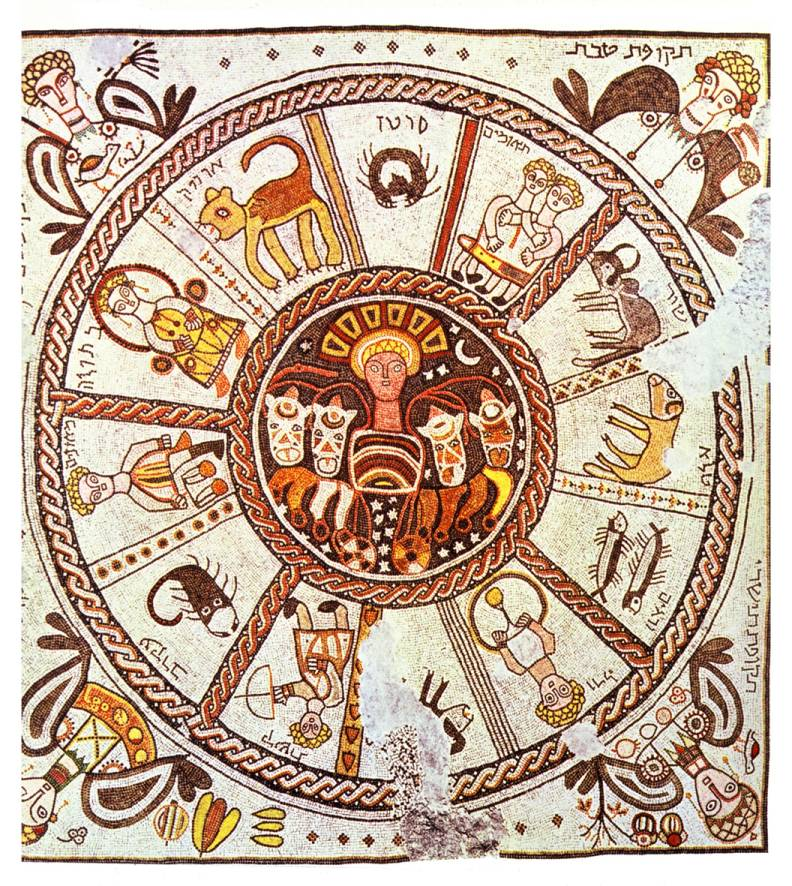
The zodiac mosaic in the Beit Alfa Synagogue

One of the earliest digs by Israeli archaeologists, the Beit Alfa Synagogue is an ancient Byzantine-era synagogue, constructed in the 5th century CE, which features a three-paneled mosaic floor. An Aramaic inscription states that the mosaic dates to the time of Justin (thought to be Justin I; ruled 518–527 CE). Each of the mosaic's three panels depicts a scene: the Holy Ark, the zodiac, and the sacrifice of Isaac. The twelve names of the zodiac are included in Hebrew. In the center is Helios, the sun god, being conveyed in his chariot by four horses. The women in the four corners of the mosaic represent the seasons.

=== Carmel Caves ===
Misliya cave, southwest of Mount Carmel, has been excavated by teams of anthropologists and archaeologists from the Archaeology Department of the University of Haifa and Tel Aviv University since 2001. In 2007, they unearthed artifacts indicative of what could be the earliest known prehistoric man. The teams uncovered handheld stone tools and blades as well as animal bones, dating to 250,000 years ago, at the time of the Mousterian culture of Neanderthals in Europe. In January 2018 it was announced that a fragment of an early modern human jawbone with eight teeth found at Misliya cave, Israel, have been dated to around 185,000 (between 177,000 and 194,000 years ago [95% CI]). This could make it the second oldest dated early modern human remain found outside of Africa, possibly after Dali Man from China dated at around 260,000 years ago. Layers dating from between 250,000 and 140,000 years ago in the same cave contained tools of the Levallois type which could put the date of the first migration even earlier if the tools can be associated with the modern human jawbone finds.

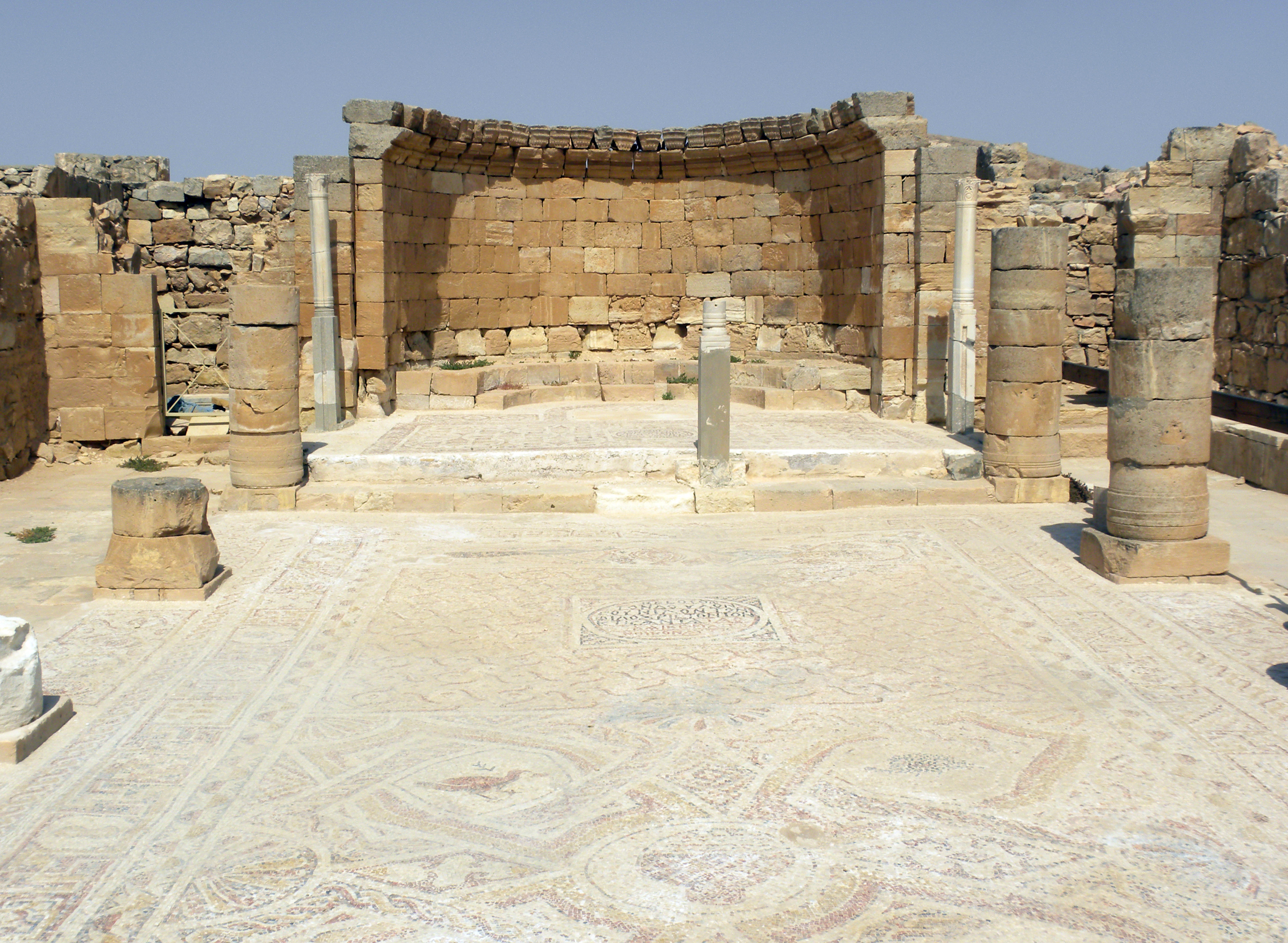
Church in Mamshit

=== Mamshit ===
Mamshit, the Nabatean city of Memphis (also known as Kurnub in Arabic), was declared a world heritage site by UNESCO in June 2005. The archaeological excavation at Mamshit uncovered the largest hoard of coins ever found in Israel: 10,500 silver coins in a bronze jar, dating to the 3rd century CE. Among the Nabatean cities found in the Negev (Avdat, Haluza, Shivta) Mamshit is the smallest (10 acres), but the best preserved and restored. Entire streets have survived intact, and numerous Nabatean buildings with open rooms, courtyards, and terraces have been restored. Most of the buildings were built in the late Nabatean period, in the 2nd century CE, after the Nabatean kingdom was annexed to Rome in 106 CE.

=== Old Acre ===
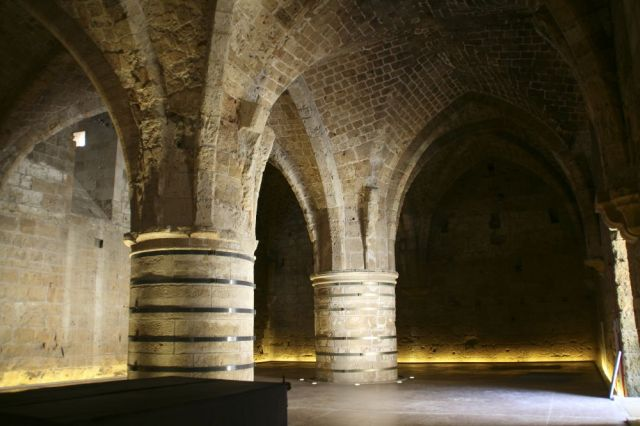
Knights Hall, Acre

Declared a UNESCO World Heritage Site in 2001, Acre's Old City has been the site of extensive archaeological excavation since the 1990s. The major find has been an underground passageway leading to a 13th-century fortress of the Knights Templar. The excavated remains of the Crusader town, dating from 1104 to 1291 CE, are well preserved, and are on display above and below the current street level.

=== Tel Rehov ===
Tel Rehov is an important Bronze and Iron Age archaeological site approximately five kilometers south of Beit She'an and three kilometers west of the Jordan River. The site represents one of the largest ancient city mounds in Israel, its surface area comprising 120,000 m^{2} in size, divided into an "Upper City" (40,000 m^{2}) and a "Lower City" (80,000 m^{2}). Archaeological excavations have been conducted at Rehov since 1997, under the directorship of Amihai Mazar. The first eight seasons of excavations revealed successive occupational layers from the Late Bronze Age and Iron Age I (12th – 11th centuries BCE). The Iron Age II levels of the site have emerged as a vitally important component in the current debate regarding the chronology of the United Monarchy of Israel. In September 2007, 30 intact beehives dated to the mid-10th to early 9th century BCE were found. The beehives are evidence of an advanced honey-producing beekeeping (apiculture) industry 3,000 years ago in the city, then thought to have a population of about 2,000. The beehives, made of straw and unbaked clay, were found in orderly rows of 100 hives. Organic material (wheat found next to the beehives) was dated using carbon-14 radiocarbon dating at the University of Groningen in the Netherlands. Also found alongside the hives was an altar decorated with fertility figurines.

=== Tel Be'er Sheva ===
A UNESCO World Heritage site since 2005, Tel Be'er Sheva is an archaeological site in southern Israel, believed to be the remains of the biblical town of Be'er Sheva. Archaeological finds indicate that the site was inhabited from the Chalcolithic period, around 4000 BCE, to the 16th century CE. This was probably due to the abundance of underground water, as evidenced by the numerous wells in the area. Excavated by Yohanan Aharoni and Ze'ev Herzog of Tel Aviv University, the settlement itself is dated to the early Israelite period. Probably populated in the 12th century BCE, the first fortified settlement dates to 1000 BCE. The city was likely destroyed by Sennacherib in 700 BCE, and after a habitation hiatus of three hundred years, there is evidence of remains from the Persian, Hellenistic, Roman and Early Arab periods. Major finds include an elaborate water system and a huge cistern carved out of the rock beneath the town, and a large horned altar which was reconstructed using several well-dressed stones found in secondary use in the walls of a later building. The altar attests to the existence of a temple or cult center in the city which was probably dismantled during the reforms of King Hezekiah.

=== Tel Megiddo ===
A UNESCO World Heritage site since 2005, Tel Megiddo comprises twenty-six stratified layers of the ruins of ancient cities in a strategic location at the head of a pass through the Carmel Ridge, which overlooks the Valley of Jezreel from the west. Megiddo has been excavated three times. The first excavations were carried out between 1903 and 1905 and a second expedition was carried out in 1925. During these excavation it was discovered that there were twenty levels of habitation, and many of the remains uncovered are preserved at the Rockefeller Museum in Jerusalem and the Oriental Institute of the University of Chicago. Yigael Yadin conducted a few small excavations in the 1960s. Since 1994, Megiddo been the subject of biannual excavation campaigns conducted by The Megiddo Expedition of Tel Aviv University, directed by Israel Finkelstein and David Ussishkin, together with a consortium of international universities. A major find from digs conducted between 1927 and 1934 were the Megiddo Stables – two tripartite structures measuring 21 meters by 11 meters, believed to have been ancient stables capable of housing nearly 500 horses.

=== Beit She'arim ===
Beit She'arim is an archaeological site of a Jewish town and necropolis, near the town of Kiryat Tiv'on, 20 km east of Haifa in the southern foothills of the Lower Galilee. Beth She'arim was excavated by Benjamin Mazar and Nahman Avigad in the 1930s and 1950s. Most of the remains date from the 2nd to 4th century CE and include the remains of a large number of individuals buried in the more than twenty catacombs of the necropolis. Together with the images on walls and sarcophagi, the inscriptions show that this was a Jewish necropolis.

=== Gath ===
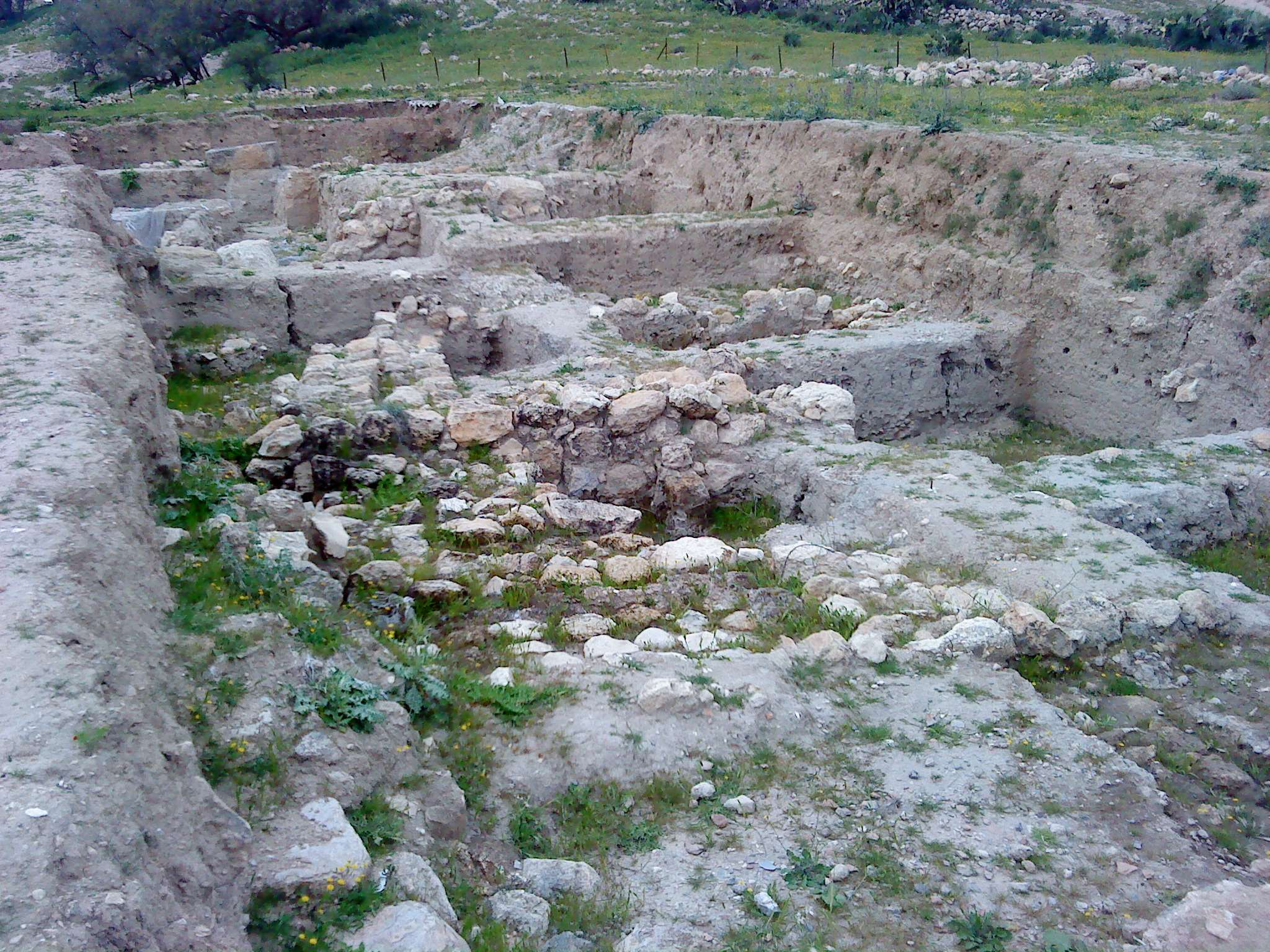
Tel Tzafit

Tell es-Safi/Gath is one of the largest pre-Classical sites in Israel, situated approximately halfway between Jerusalem and Ashkelon, on the border between coastal plain and the Judean foothills (Shephelah). The site was settled from prehistoric to modern times, and was of particular importance during the Bronze and Iron Ages, and during the Crusader period. The site is identified as Canaanite and Philistine Gath, and during the Iron Age was one of the five main cities (the Pentapolis) of the Philistines. The site was excavated briefly in 1899 by the British archaeologists Frederick Jones Bliss and Robert Alexander Stewart Macalister, and since 1996, by a team from Bar-Ilan University directed by Aren Maeir. Among the noteworthy finds from the ongoing excavations are the impressive late 9th-century BCE destruction level (Stratum A3), apparently evidence of the destruction of Gath by Hazael of Aram (see II Kings 12:18), a unique siege system relating to this event that surrounds the site (the earliest known siege system in the world), a 10th/9th-century BCE inscription written in archaic alphabetic script, mentioning two names of Indo-European nature, somewhat reminiscent of the etymological origins of the name Goliath, and a large stone altar with two "horns" from the 9th-century BCE destruction level – which while very similar to the biblical description of the altar in the Tabernacle (in Exodus 30), has only two horns (as opposed to four in other known examples), perhaps indicating a unique type of Philistine altar, perhaps influenced from Cypriot, and perhaps Minoan, culture.

=== Gezer ===
Tel Gezer is an archaeological site which sits on the western flank of the Shephelah, overlooking the coastal plain of Israel, near the junction between Via Maris and the trunk road leading to Jerusalem. The tel consists of two mounds with a saddle between them, spanning roughly 30 acres (120,000 m^{2}). A dozen inscribed boundary stones found in the vicinity verify the identification of the mound as Gezer, making it the first positively identified biblical city. Gezer is mentioned in several ancient sources, including the Hebrew Bible and the Amarna letters. The biblical references describe it as one of Solomon's royal store cities. R.A.S. Macalister excavated Gezer from 1902 to 1909 with a one-year hiatus in 1906. Major findings include a soft limestone tablet, named the Gezer calendar, which describes the agricultural chores associated with each month of the year. The calendar is written in paleo-Hebrew script, and is one of the oldest known examples of Hebrew writing, dating to the 10th century BCE. Also found was a six-chambered gate similar to those found at Hazor and Megiddo, and ten monumental megaliths.

=== Masada ===
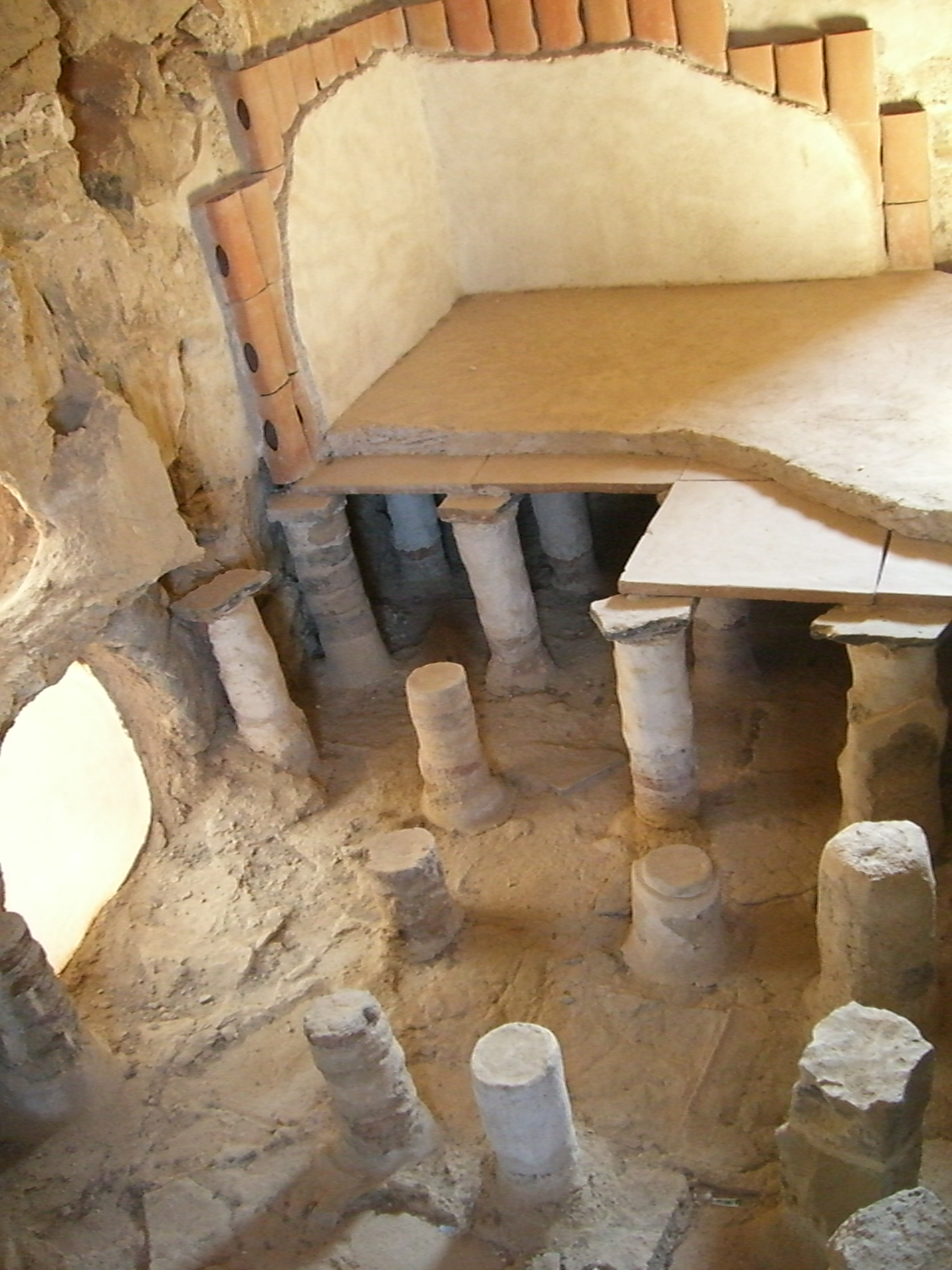
Thermal baths, Masada

A UNESCO World Heritage Site since 2001, Masada is the site of ancient palaces and fortifications in the Southern District (Israel) on top of an isolated rock plateau, or large mesa, on the eastern edge of the Judean Desert overlooking the Dead Sea. According to Josephus, a 1st-century Jewish-Roman historian, Herod the Great fortified Masada between 37 and 31 BCE as a refuge for himself in the event of a revolt. Josephus also writes that in 66 CE, at the beginning of the First Jewish-Roman War against the Roman Empire, a group of Judaic extremist rebels called the Sicarii took Masada from the Roman garrison stationed there. The site of Masada was identified in 1842 and extensively excavated between 1963 and 1965 by an expedition led by Israeli archaeologist Yigael Yadin. Due to the remoteness from human habitation and the arid environment, the site has remained largely untouched by humans or nature during the past two millennia. Many of the ancient buildings have been restored, as have the wall-paintings of Herod's two main palaces, and the Roman-style bathhouses that he built. A synagogue thought to have been used by the Jewish rebels has also been identified and restored. Inside the synagogue, an ostracon bearing the inscription me'aser kohen ("tithe for the priest") was found, as were fragments of two scrolls. Also found were eleven small ostraca, each bearing a single name. One reads "ben Yair" and could be short for Eleazar ben Yair, the commander of the fortress. Excavations also uncovered the remains of 28 skeletons. Carbon dating of textiles found in the cave indicate they are contemporaneous with the period of the revolt. The remnants of a Byzantine church dating from the 5th and 6th centuries CE, have also been excavated on the top of Masada.

=== Tel Arad ===
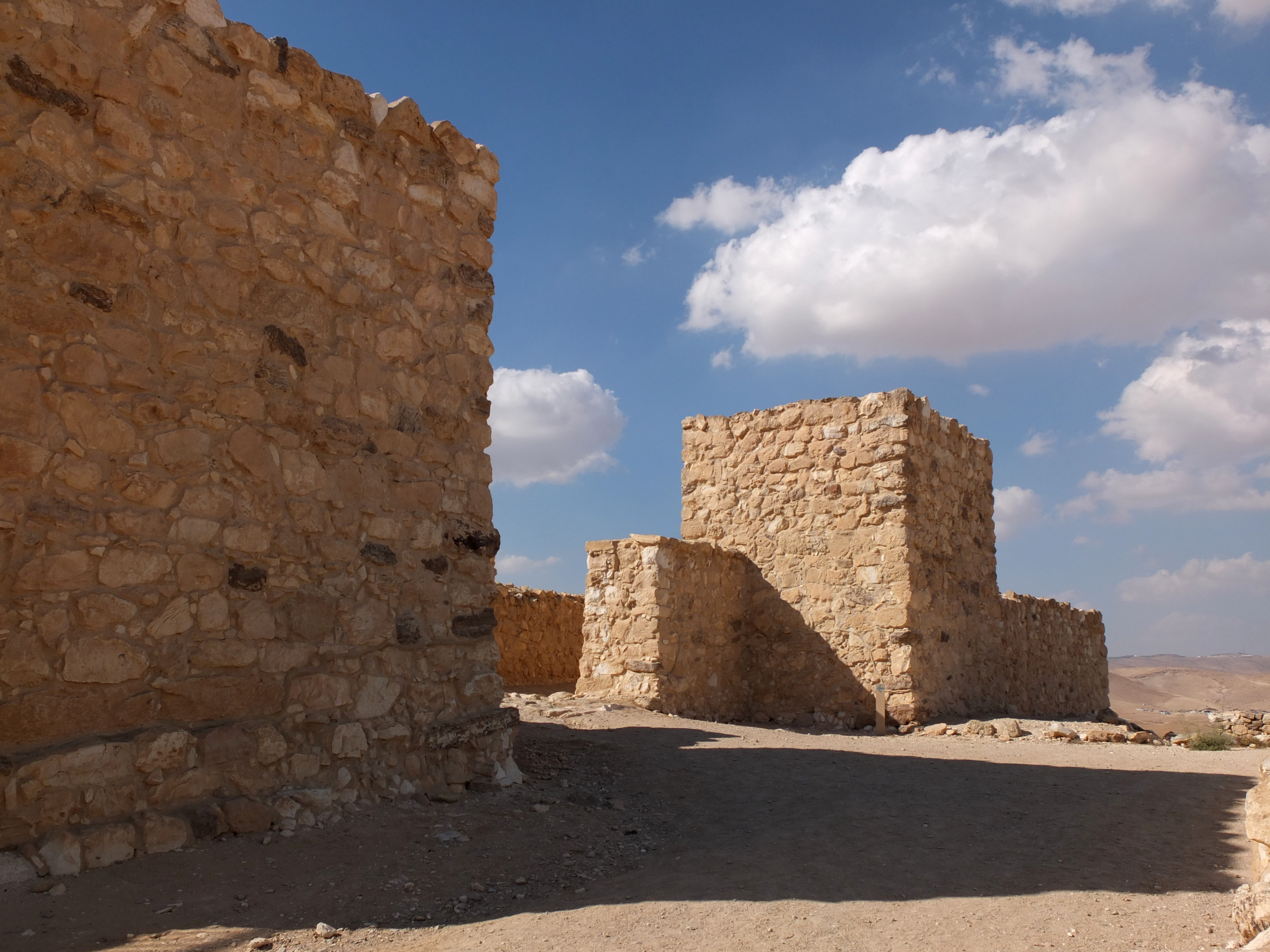
Tel Arad

Tel Arad is located west of the Dead Sea, about ten kilometers west of modern Arad. Excavations at the site conducted by Israeli archaeologist Yohanan Aharoni in 1962 have unearthed an extensive early Bronze Age settlement that was completely deserted and destroyed by 2700 BCE. The site was then apparently deserted until a new settlement was founded on the southeastern ridge of the ancient city during the Iron Age II. The major find was a garrison-town known as 'The Citadel', constructed in the time of King David and Solomon. A Judean temple, the earliest ever to be discovered in an excavation, dates back to the mid-10th century BCE. An inscription found on the site by Aharoni mentions a 'House of YHWH', which William G. Dever suggests may have referred to the temple at Arad or the temple at Jerusalem. The Arad temple was probably demolished around 700 CE, which is before the date of the inscription.

=== Tel Dan ===
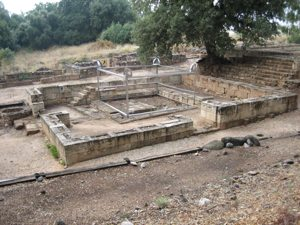
Tel Dan

Tel Dan, previously named Tell el-Qadi, is a mound where a city once stood, located at the northern tip of modern-day Israel. Finds at the site date back to the Neolithic era circa 4500 BCE, and include 0.8 meter wide walls and pottery shards. The most important find is the Tel Dan Stele, a black basalt stele, whose fragments were discovered in 1993 and 1994. The stele was erected by an Aramaean king and contains an Aramaic inscription to commemorate his victory over the ancient Hebrews. It has generated much excitement because the inscription includes the letters 'ביתדוד', Hebrew for "house of David". Proponents of that reading argue that it is the first time that the name "David" has been recognized at any archaeological site, lending evidence for the Bible account of David's kingdom. Others read the Hebrew letters 'דוד' as "beloved", "uncle" "kettle", or "a god named Dod", (all of which are possible readings of vowel-less Hebrew), and argue this is not a reference to Biblical David.

=== Tel Hazor ===
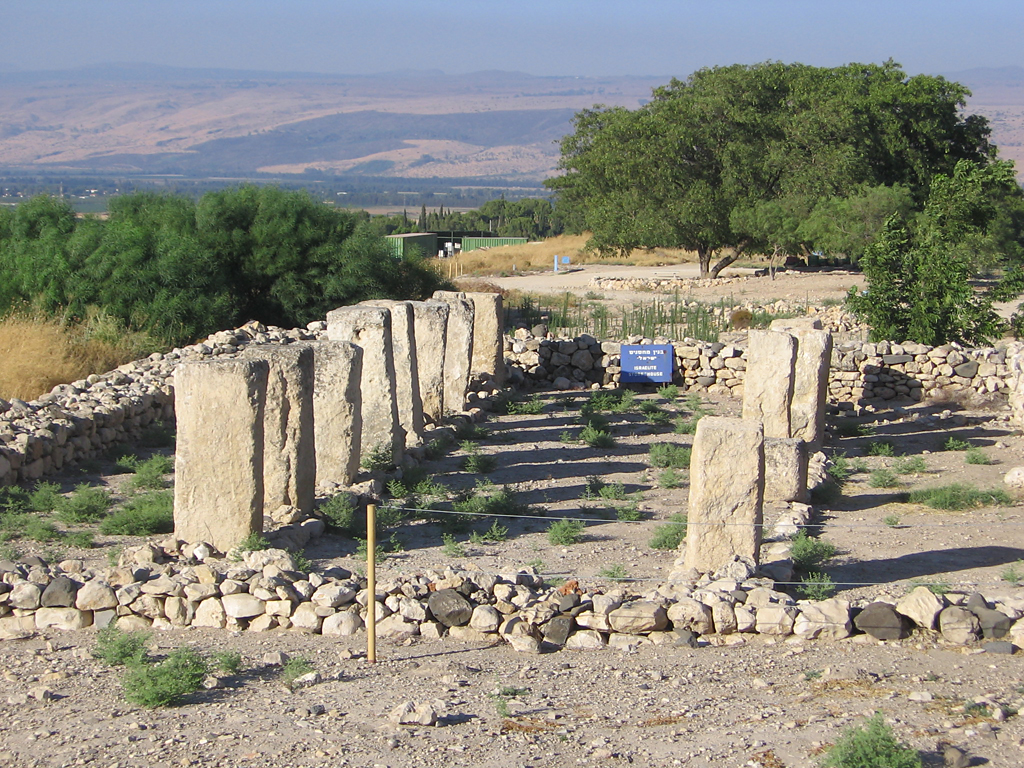
House of Pillars, Tel Hazor

A UNESCO World Heritage site since 2005, Tel Hazor has been excavated repeatedly since 1955. Other findings include an ancient Canaanite city, which experienced a catastrophic fire in the sometime in the 13th century BCE. The date and causes of the violent destruction of Canaanite Hazor have been an important issue ever since the first excavations of the site. One school of thought, represented by Yigael Yadin, Yohanan Aharoni and Amnon Ben-Tor, dates the destruction to the later half of the 13th century, tying it to biblical descriptions in Joshua which hold the Israelites responsible for the event. The second school of thought, represented by Olga Tufnell, Kathleen Kenyon, P. Beck, Moshe Kochavi and Israel Finkelstein, tends to support an earlier date in the first half of the 13th century, in which case there is no necessary connection between the destruction of Hazor and the process of settlement by Israelite Tribes in Cannan. Other findings at the site include a distinctive six chambered gate dating to the Early Iron Age, as well as pottery and administrative buildings dating to either the 10th century and King Solomon or, on a lowered chronology, to the Omrides of the 9th century.

=== Sepphoris ===
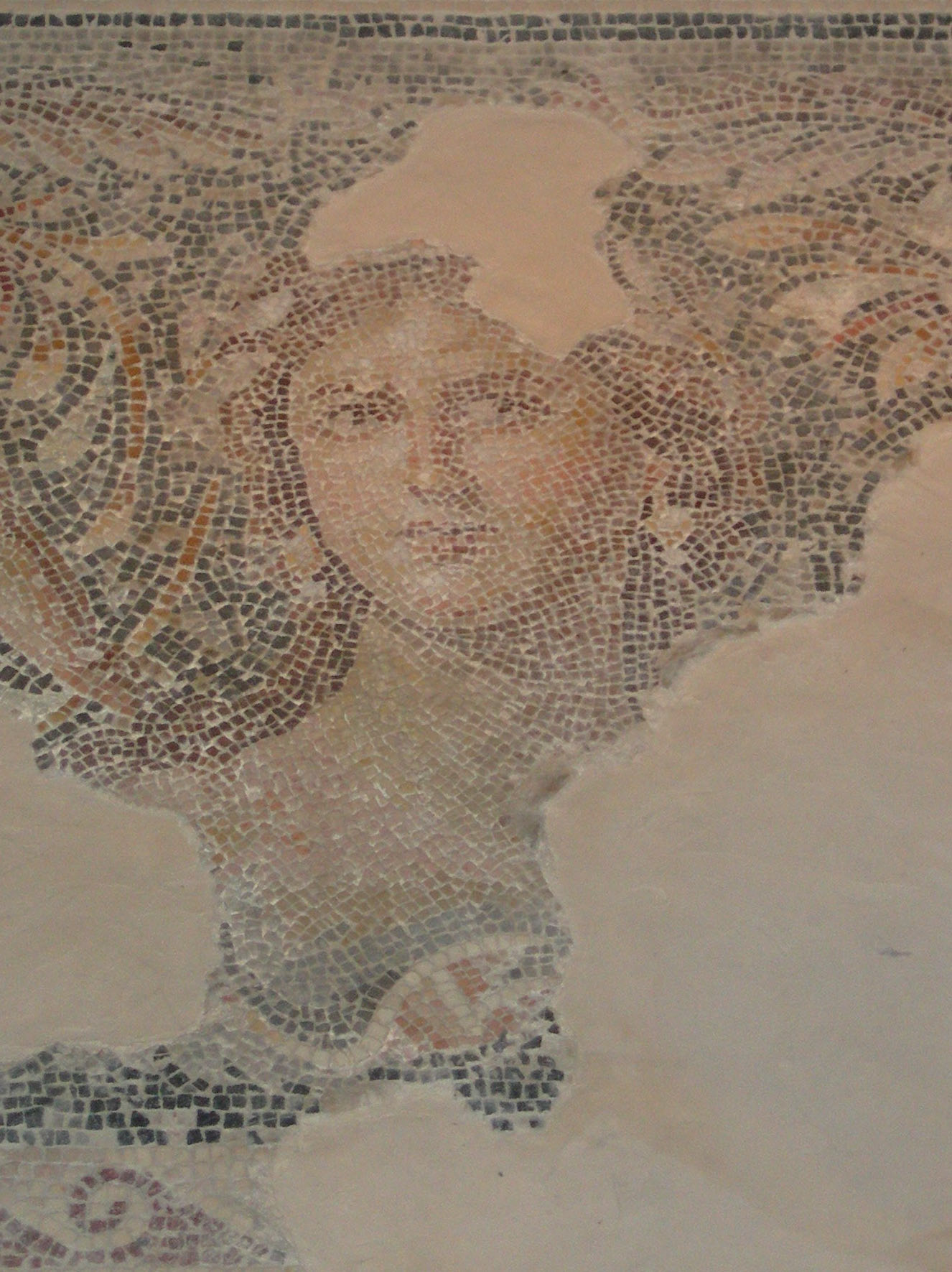
Mosaic known as "Mona Lisa of the Galilee"

Excavations in Sepphoris, in the central Galilee region, six kilometers north-northwest of Nazareth, have uncovered a rich and diverse historical and architectural legacy that includes Assyrian, Hellenistic, Judean, Babylonian, Roman, Byzantine, Islamic, Crusader, Arabic and Ottoman influences. The site is especially rich in mosaics belonging to different periods. Major findings include the remains of a 6th-century synagogue, evidence of an interesting fusion of Jewish and pagan beliefs. A Roman villa, considered the centerpiece of the discoveries, which dates to the year 200 CE, was destroyed in the Galilee earthquake of 363 CE. The mosaic floor was discovered in August 1987 during an expedition led by Eric and Carol Meyers, of Duke University digging with Ehud Netzer, a locally trained archaeologist from the Hebrew University of Jerusalem. It depicts Dionysus, the god of wine, socializing with Pan and Hercules in several of the 15 panels. In its center is a lifelike image of a young lady, possibly Venus, which has been named "The Mona Lisa of the Galilee". Additional finds include a Roman theater on the northern slope of the hill, and the remains of a 5th-century public building, with a large and intricate mosaic floor.

=== Gesher Bnot Ya'akov ===
Bnot Ya'akov Bridge is currently excavated by Naama Goren-Inbar of the Hebrew University of Jerusalem. "[Several] hundred meters of the 1.5-mile-long site [was] obliterated by bulldozers" during 1999."

=== Ain Mallaha ===
Ain Mallaha, a Natufian village, colonized in three phases 12,000 to 9600 BCE, contains the earliest known archaeological evidence of dog domestication: the burial of a human being with a dog.

=== Qesem cave ===
In Qesem cave, 400,000 years old teeth very similar to modern human teeth were found.

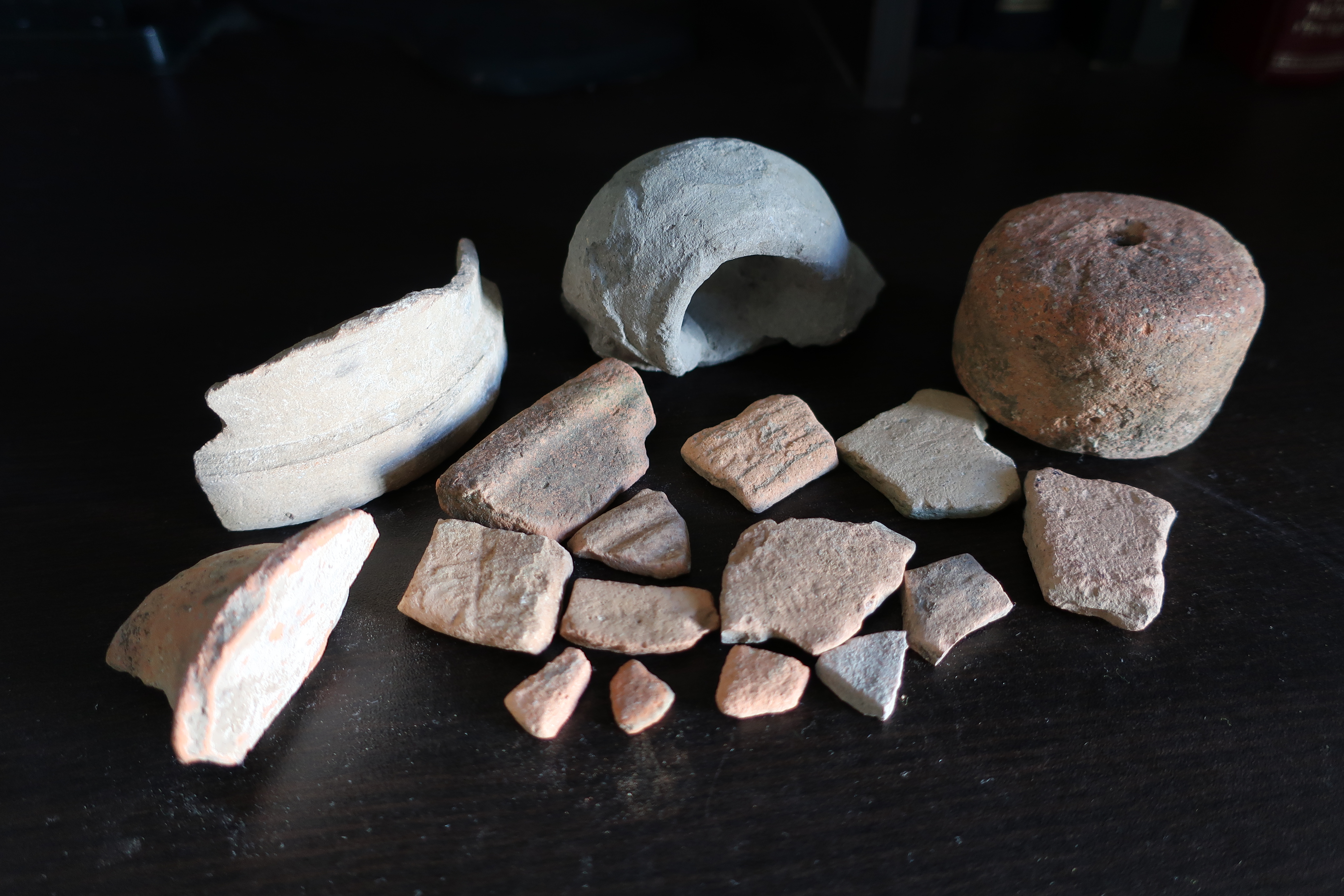
Potsherds and loom-weight found at archaeological sites in Israel

== Archaeological institutions ==
During the last hundred years of Ottoman rule in Palestine, European archaeologists active in the region tended to be Christian, backed by the dominant European powers of the time and the Churches. With the transition from Ottoman to British rule over the land, the pursuit of archaeology became less political and religious in nature and instead took on a more purely historical and scientific character. After World War I (1914–1918) and the establishment of the British Mandate, archaeological institutions tended increasingly to be concentrated in the city of Jerusalem.

In 1913–1914 the Society for the Reclamation of Antiquities was established by the Yishuv's intellectual elite. Among its founder were Avraham Yaakov Brawer, David Yellin and Aharon Meir Mazie. The Society changed its name to the Jewish Palestine Exploration Society in 1920 and later to the Israel Exploration Society.

The British School of Archaeology in Jerusalem began operating in 1921, after R. A. Stewart Macalister and Duncan Mackenzie of the Palestine Exploration Fund appealed to the British government for the establishment of a local antiquities authority. Macalister and Mackenzie expressed concern over the dangers posed to archaeological sites on account of the battles being fought throughout the land. Mackenzie was also wary of fellahin raiding archaeological sites and stealing artifacts.

The Hebrew University of Jerusalem Institute of Archaeology was founded in 1926. In 1934 Hebrew University opened its Department of Archaeology, which it considers "the birthplace of Israeli archaeology". The Tel Aviv University Institute of Archaeology was established in 1969.

After the establishment of the State of Israel in 1948, the British Mandatory Department of Antiquities, housed at the Rockefeller Museum, became the Department of Antiquities of the State of Israel. In 1990 the Department of Antiquities became the Israel Antiquities Authority, an autonomous government authority charged with responsibility for all the country's antiquities and authorized to excavate, preserve, conserve and administrate antiquities as necessary.

== Notable Israeli archaeologists ==
- Eleazar Sukenik (1889–1953)
- Benjamin Mazar (1906–1995), a founding father of Israeli archaeology
- Yigael Yadin (1917–1984)
- Amir Drori (1937–2005), founder of the Israel Antiquities Authority in 1990
- Israel Finkelstein (1949–present), known for his rejection of the United Monarchy as fact, proposed a later date for Iron Age Israelite archaeology under the Low Chronology
- Amnon Ben-Tor (1935–present), author of Archaeology of Ancient Israel, noted critic of Finkelstein's Low Chronology
- Amihai Mazar (1942–present) Nephew of Benjamin Mazar, noted for his Modified Conventional Chronology, a counter to Finkelstein's Low Chronology
- Eilat Mazar (1956–2021) Granddaughter of Benjamin Mazar, proponent of the Modified Conventional Chronology, and discoverer of the Large Stone Structure, thought by Conventional Chronology proponents to be the palace of David

== New technologies ==
Israeli archaeologists have developed a method of detecting objects buried dozens of meters underground using a combination of seven technologies, among them echomagnetic soundings, radio transmissions and temperature measurements, able to distinguish between relevant and irrelevant objects such as pipes in the ground.

== Politicisation of archaeology ==
Excavations outside the southern wall of the Temple Mount

Archaeological research and preservation efforts have been exploited by both Palestinians and Israelis for partisan ends. Rather than attempting to understand "the natural process of demolition, eradication, rebuilding, evasion, and ideological reinterpretation that has permitted ancient rulers and modern groups to claim exclusive possession," archaeologists have instead become active participants in the battle over partisan memory, with the result that archaeology, a seemingly objective science, has exacerbated the ongoing nationalist dispute. According to Silberman, "claims and counterclaims about exclusive historical 'ownership' weave together the random acts of violence of bifurcated collective memory." Adam and Moodley conclude their investigation into this issue by writing that, "Both sides remain prisoners of their mythologized past."

As an example of this process, an archaeological tunnel running the length of the western side of the Temple Mount, as it is known to Jews, or the Haram al-Sharif, as it is known to Muslims, became a serious point of contestation in 1996. The tunnel had been in place for about a dozen years, but open conflict broke out after the government of Benjamin Netanyahu decided to open a new entrance to the tunnel from the Via Dolorosa in the Muslim quarter of the Old City. Palestinians and the Islamic Waqf authorities were outraged that the decision was taken without prior consultation. They claimed that the work threatened the foundations of the compound and those of houses in the Muslim quarter and that it was actually aimed at tunnelling under the holy compound complex to find remains of Solomon's Temple, similar to previous accusations in the 1980s. As a result of the rumor, Arabs rioted in Jerusalem and then spread to the West Bank, leading to the deaths of 86 Palestinians and 15 Israeli soldiers.

== Damage to sites ==
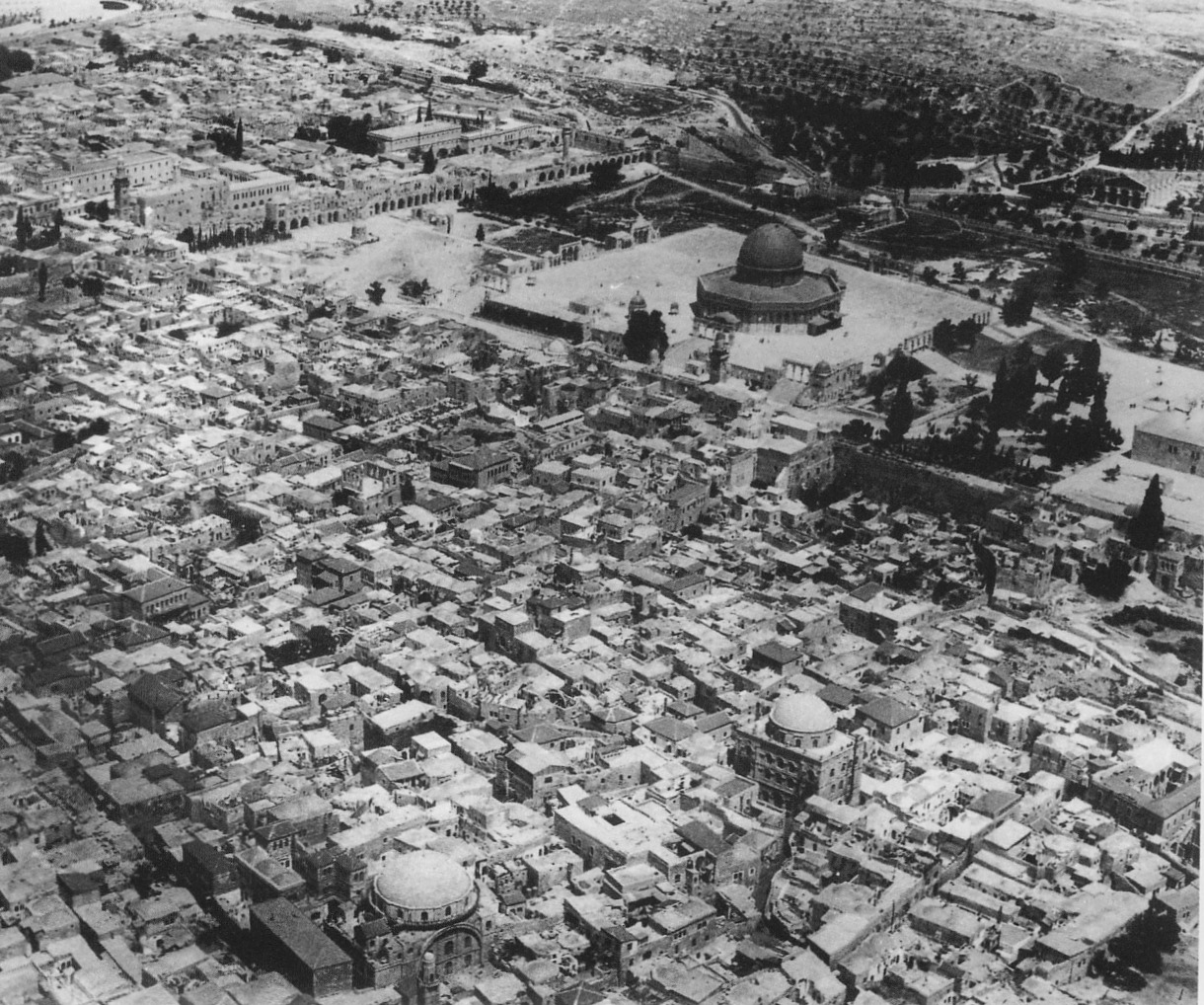
The Old City of Jerusalem in the early 20th century. The Jewish quarter is at the bottom of the image. The two large domes are the Hurva Synagogue and the Tiferes Yisrael Synagogue, both destroyed by the Jordanians in 1948. Above it is the Moroccan Quarter (also known as the Mughrabi Quarter), destroyed by the Israelis in 1967.

After the 1948 Arab–Israeli War, Arab historic sites newly under Israel's control received little research and were neglected. Anti-Muslim sentiment in Israel led to Muslim cemeteries being damaged, continuing into the 1960s.

From 1948 to 1967, the Jordanian authorities and military forces engaged in what was described as "calculated destruction" in the Jewish Quarter of the Old City of Jerusalem. In a letter to the United Nations, Yosef Tekoah, Israel's representative to the UN, protested Jordan's "policy of wanton vandalism, desecration and violation," in which all the synagogues in the Old City apart from one were blown up or used as stables. A road was cut through the ancient historic Jewish graveyard on the Mount of Olives, and tens of thousands of tombstones, some dating from as early as 1 BCE, were torn out, broken or used as flagstones, steps and building materials in Jordanian military installations.

On 10 June 1967, the Israeli army razed the Mughrabi Quarter in Jerusalem. As well as demolishing more than a hundred homes of Muslim families and leaving hundreds of people homeless, this involved the destruction of historic sites.

The Old City of Jerusalem and its walls were added to the List of World Heritage in Danger in 1982, after it was nominated for inclusion by Jordan. Noting the "severe destruction followed by a rapid urbanization," UNESCO determined that the site met "the criteria proposed for the inscription of properties on the List of World Heritage in Danger as they apply to both 'ascertained danger' and 'potential danger'."

Work carried out by the Islamic Waqf since the late 1990s to convert two ancient underground structures into a new mosque on the Temple Mount damaged archaeological artifacts in the area of Solomon's Stables and the Huldah Gates. From October 1999 to January 2000, the Waqf authorities in Jerusalem opened an emergency exit to the newly renovated underground mosque, in the process digging a pit measuring 18,000 square feet (1,672 m^{2}) and 36 feet (11 m) deep. The Israel Antiquities Authority (IAA) expressed concern over the damage sustained to Muslim-period structures within the compound. Jon Seligman, a Jerusalem District archaeologist told Archaeology magazine that, "It was clear to the IAA that an emergency exit [at the Marwani Mosque] was necessary, but in the best situation, salvage archaeology would have been performed first." Seligman said that the lack of archaeological supervision "has meant a great loss to all of humanity. It was an archaeological crime."

Artifacts from the First Temple Period (c. 960–586 BCE) were destroyed when the thousands of tons of ancient fill from the site were dumped in the Kidron Valley and Jerusalem's municipal garbage dump, making it impossible to conduct archaeological examination.

The 2011 annual report of the Israeli State Comptroller criticized Waqf renovations on the Temple Mount, which were carried out without permits and employed mechanical tools that caused damage to archaeological relics.

In 2012, Bedouin gold-diggers irreversibly damaged the walls of a 2,000-year-old well located under a Crusader structure at Be'er Limon, near Beit Shemesh.

== See also ==
- List of archaeological sites in Israel and Palestine
- Archaeological remnants of the Jerusalem Temple
- Biblical archaeology
- Excavations at the Temple Mount
- History of Israel
- Palestinian archaeology
- Levantine archaeology
- List of artifacts in biblical archaeology
- Near Eastern archaeology
- Southern Levant
- Temple Mount Sifting Project
