= Gezer calendar =

Small limestone tablet with an early Canaanite inscription

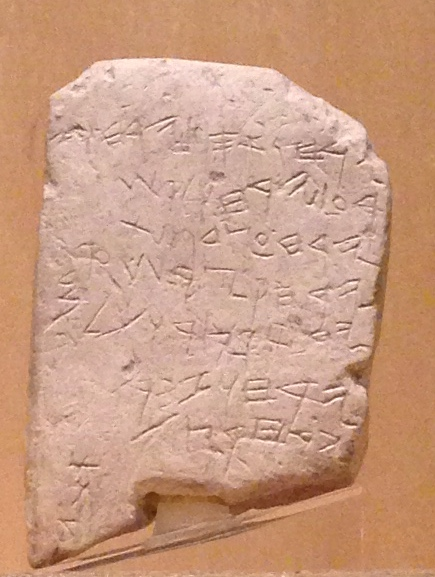
- The calendar in its current location
- Material: Limestone
- Size: 11.1 × 7.2 cm
- Writing: Phoenician or Paleo-Hebrew
- Created: c. 10th century BCE
- Discovered: 1908
- Present location: Istanbul Archaeology Museums
- Identification: 2089 T

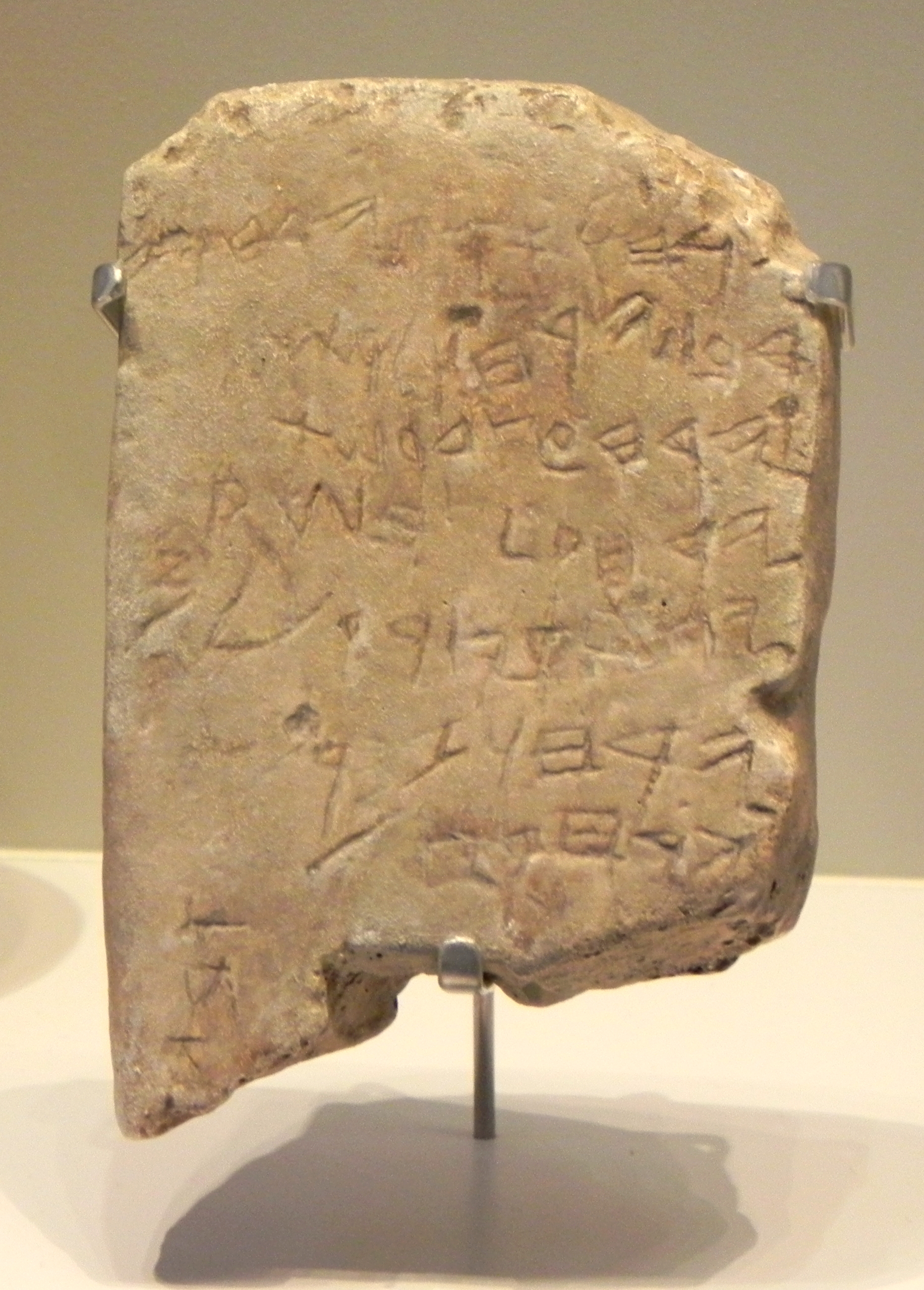
Replica of the Gezer calendar in Israel Museum, Israel.

The Gezer calendar is a small limestone tablet with an early Canaanite inscription discovered in 1908 by Irish archaeologist R. A. Stewart Macalister in the ancient city of Gezer, 20 miles west of Jerusalem. It is commonly dated to the 10th century BCE, but the dating is uncertain, because the excavation was not stratified.

Scholars are divided as to whether the language is Phoenician or a northern dialect of Hebrew and whether the script is Phoenician, Paleo-Hebrew, or Proto-Canaanite. Aaron Koller surmises that the language is a northern dialect of Hebrew, while Dennis Pardee proposes that it is Phoenician.

The inscription is not a formal calendar, as it describes agricultural seasons with imprecise dates, rather than precise divisions of time as would be required for a ritual or bureaucratic calendar. As such, some of the time units comprise two months rather than one, and none are referred to by the month numbers or names known from other sources.

== Inscription ==
The calendar is inscribed on a limestone plaque and describes monthly or bi-monthly periods and attributes to each a duty such as harvest, planting, or tending specific crops.

The inscription, known as KAI 182, is in Phoenician or Paleo-Hebrew script:

𐤉𐤓𐤇𐤅𐤀𐤎𐤐.𐤉𐤓𐤇𐤅𐤆
𐤓𐤏.𐤉𐤓𐤇𐤅𐤋𐤒𐤔
𐤉𐤓𐤇𐤏𐤑𐤃𐤐𐤔𐤕
𐤉𐤓𐤇𐤒𐤑𐤓𐤔𐤏𐤓𐤌
𐤉𐤓𐤇𐤒𐤑𐤓𐤅𐤊𐤋
𐤉𐤓𐤇𐤅𐤆𐤌𐤓
𐤉𐤓𐤇𐤒𐤑

𐤀𐤁𐤉(𐤄)

Which in equivalent square Hebrew letters is as follows:

ירחואספ ירחוז
רע ירחולקש
ירחעצדפשת
ירחקצרשערמ
ירחקצרוכל
ירחוזמר
ירחקצ

אבי(ה)

This corresponds to the following transliteration, with spaces added for word divisions:

yrḥw ʾsp yrḥw z
rʿ yrḥw lqš
yrḥ ʿṣd pšt
yrḥ qṣr šʿrm
yrḥ qṣrw kl
yrḥw zmr
yrḥ qṣ

ʾby[h]

The text has been translated as:

A couple of months (yarḥêw, in the dual) of gathering
A couple of months of early sowing
A couple of months of late sowing
A month of making hay
A month of harvesting barley
A month of harvest and finishing
A couple of months of vine pruning
A month of summer fruit.

Abij[ah]

Possible equivalent months:

October, November — in the Hebrew calendar Tishrei, Cheshvan
December, January — Kislev, Tevet
February, March — Shvat, Adar
April — Nisan
May — Iyar
June — Sivan
July, August — Tammuz, Av
September — Elul

Scholars have speculated that the calendar could be a schoolboy's memory exercise, the text of a popular folk song or a children's song. Another possibility is something designed for the collection of taxes from farmers.

The scribe of the calendar is potentially written at the bottom of the tablet: "Abijah", meaning "Jah (a shorter form of Yahweh) is my father". This name appears in the Bible for several individuals, including a king of Judah (1 Kings 14:31). If accurate, then it could be an early attestation of the name YHWH, potentially predating the Mesha Stele.

== History ==
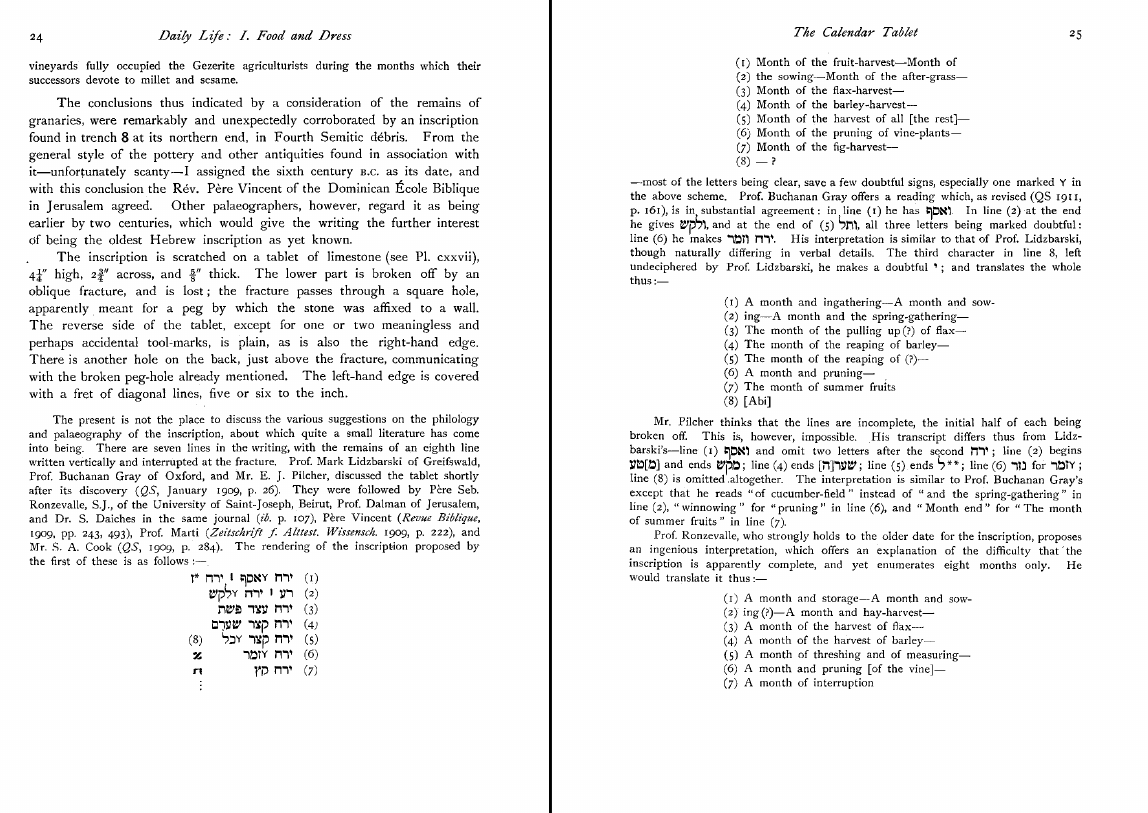
Dig not stratified, as shown here on suppositions of dating in Macalister's second volume on Gezer

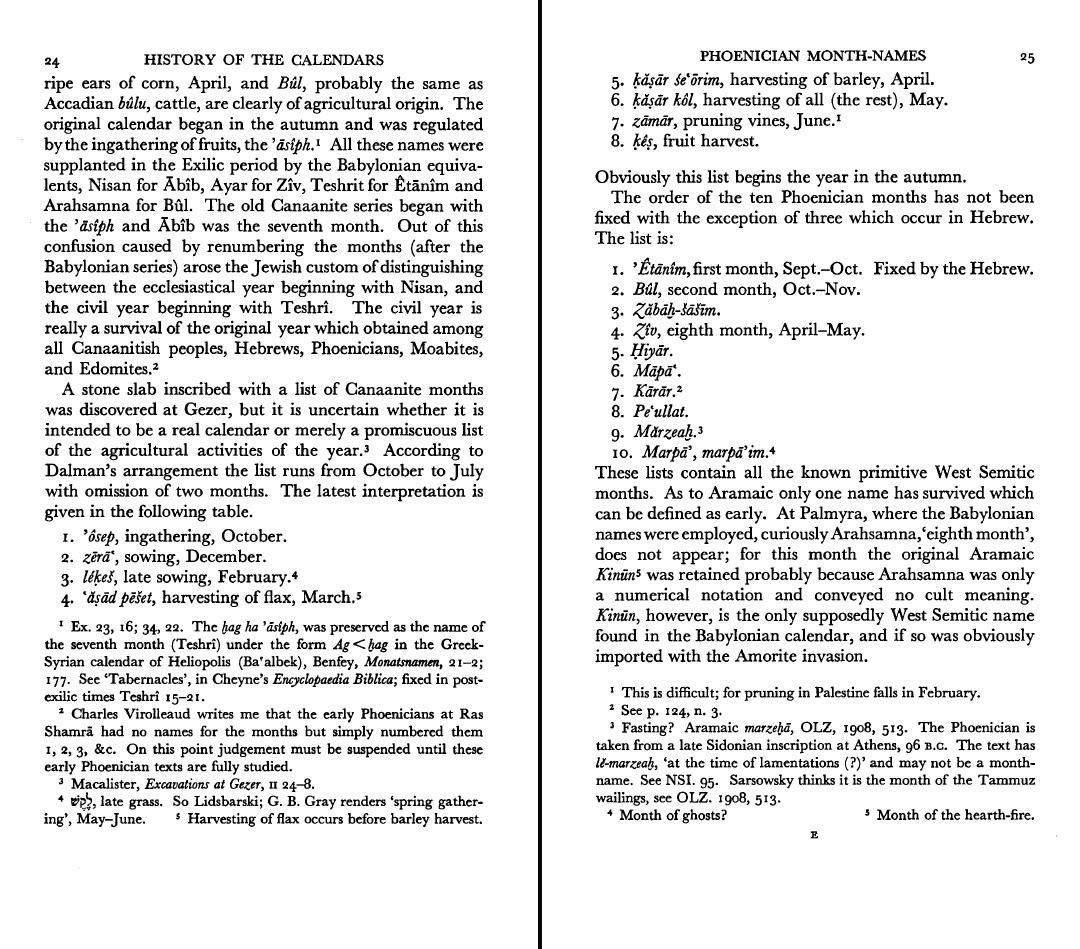

The calendar was discovered in 1908 by R.A.S. Macalister of the Palestine Exploration Fund while excavating the ancient Canaanite city of Gezer, 20 miles west of Jerusalem.

The Gezer calendar is currently displayed at the Museum of the Ancient Orient, a Turkish archaeology museum, as is the Siloam inscription and other archaeological artifacts unearthed before World War I. A replica of the Gezer calendar is on display at the Israel Museum, Israel.

== See also ==
- List of artifacts significant to the Bible
- List of ancient Near Eastern scribes
- List of languages by first written accounts
- Archaeology of Israel
