= Treasure cave =

Treasure cave may refer to

- A cave with treasure
- Cave of Treasures, New Testament apocrypha
- An attraction at Kings Dominion
- Treasure Cave brand blue cheese by Caves of Faribault, Faribault, Minnesota, United States
- Treasure Cave, an archaeological site by Nahal Mishmar, Israel
