= Bar-Adon =

Bar-Adon is a Hebrew-language surname literally meaning "son of Adon". Notable people with the surname include:

- Dorothy Bar-Adon (1907–1950), American-born Israeli journalist
- Pessah Bar-Adon (1907–1985), Polish-born Israeli archaeologist and writer
