= Levantine Chalcolithic =

Copper Age in the Eastern Mediterranean

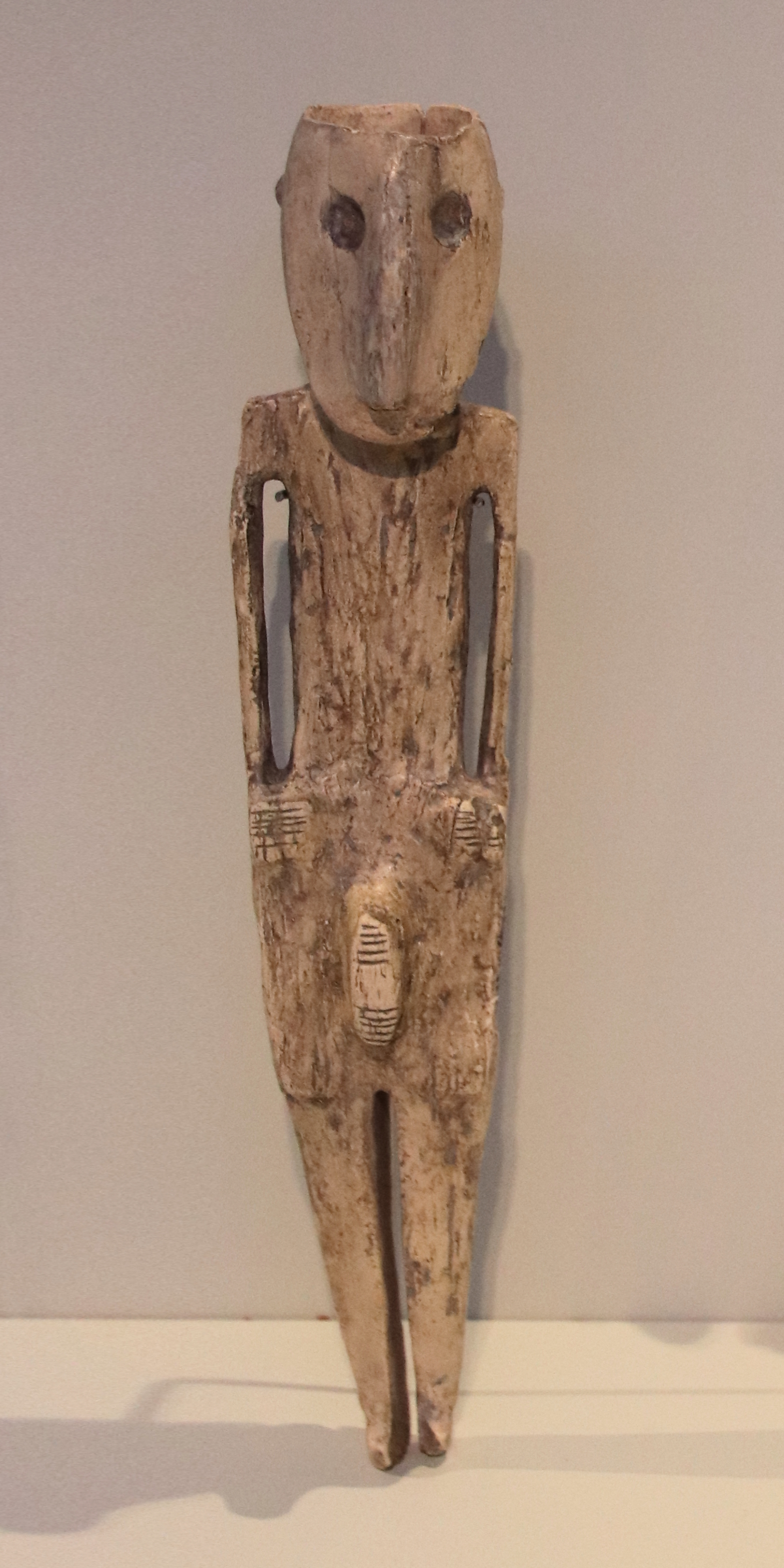
Levant Chalcolithic male figurine, 4500–3500 BCE. Bir es-Safadi.

The Levantine Chalcolithic marks an archaeological period spanning around 4500–3500 BCE in the Levant. Technologically, the "chalcolithic" is defined by the appearance of copper and/or painted pottery. It was characterized by numerous small sedentary farming communities, depending on the culture of barley, wheat, lentils, and fruit trees, and the animal husbandry centered around sheep-goats, pigs, and cattle. This was a period of major cultural and technological transformation.

== Background ==
The rise of the Halafian culture of northeastern Syria, c. 5500 BCE, influenced cultural developments in the whole Levant. The period saw rapid cultural changes, due to the influence of neighboring Egypt and Mesopotamia. Various influences from Naqada culture Egypt have been recorded, especially in the production of ivory statuettes. In many instance, interactions with Northern Egypt seem to have been going in the two directions, with also many Levantine artifacts found in the Nile Delta.

The Chalcolithic period was first identified at Teleilat el-Ghassul in Jordan during excavations in the 1920s and 1930s. Since then there have been major projects investigating Chaloclithic sites in present-day Cyprus, Israel, Jordan, Lebanon, Palestine, and Syria.

== Periodisation ==
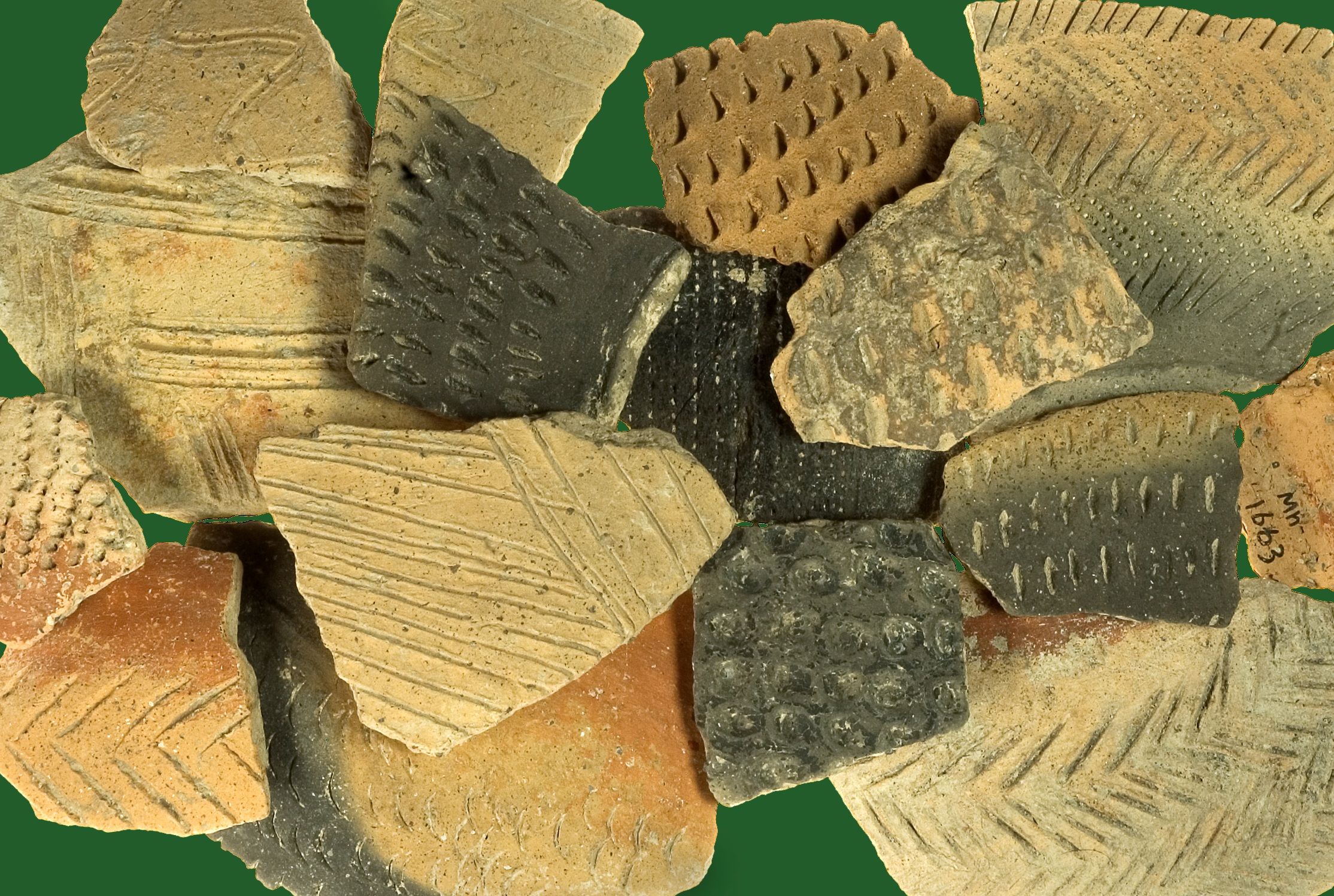
Early Chalcolithic pottery from Munhata

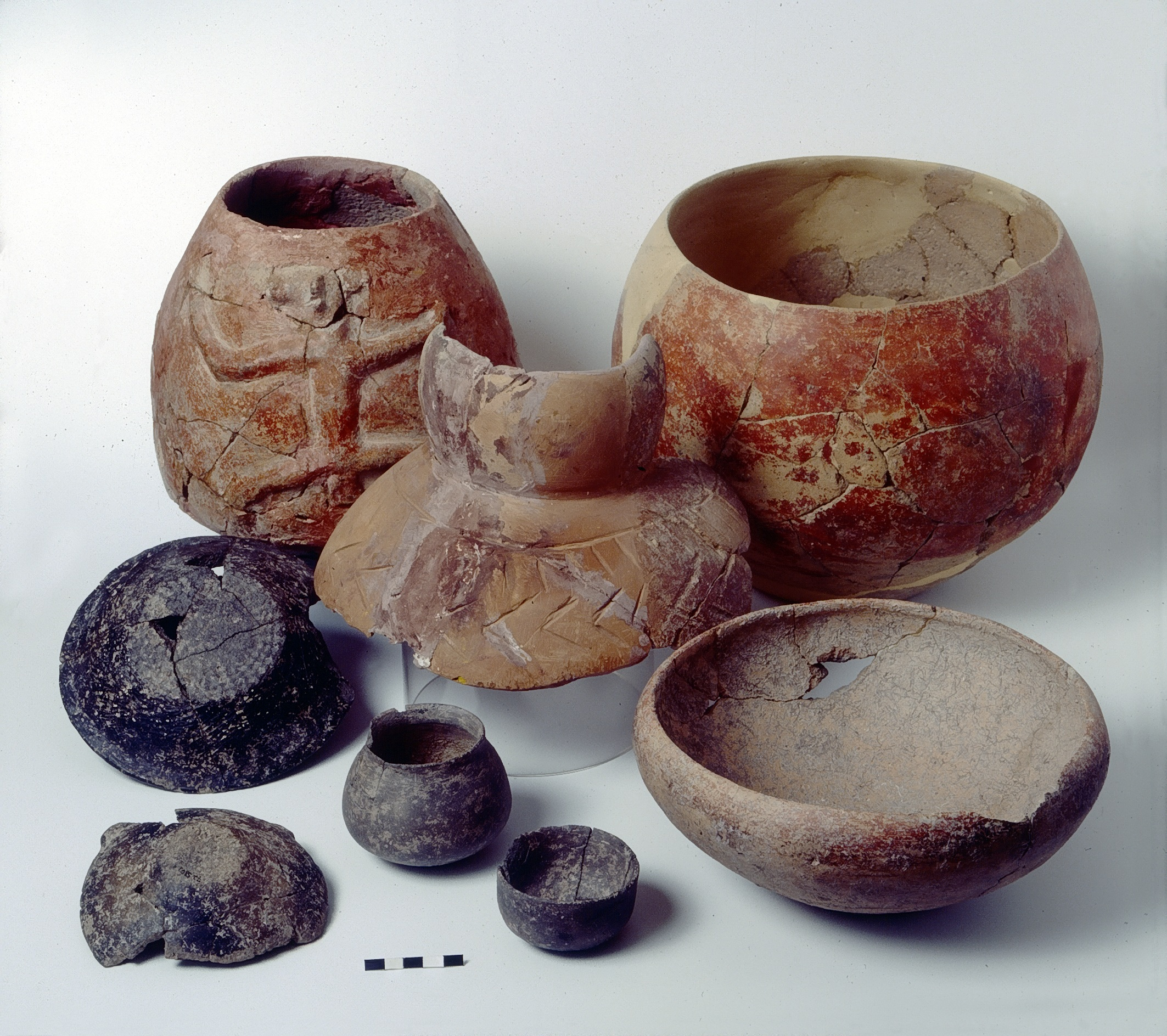
Early Chalcolithic pottery from Hazireah

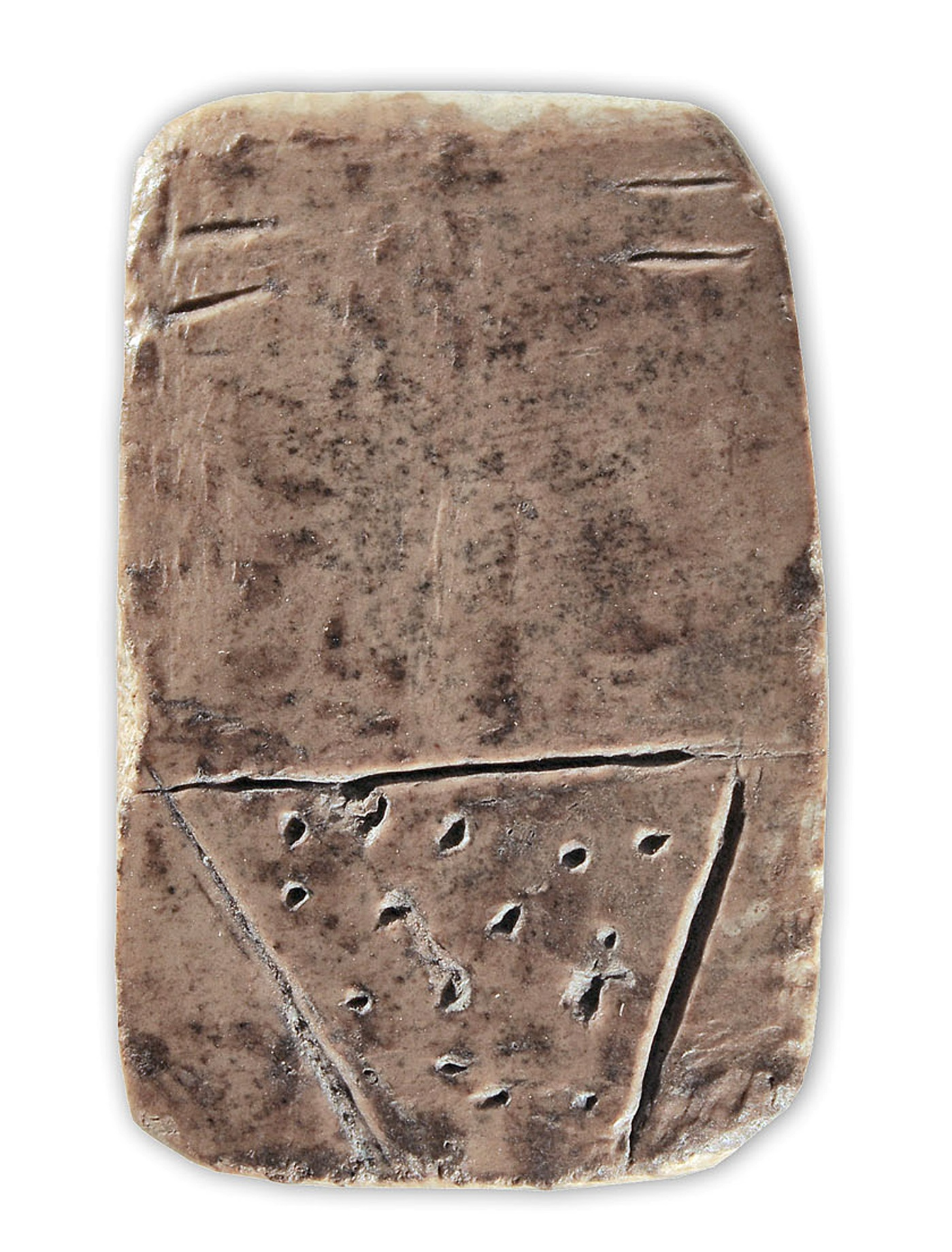
Early Chalcolithic figurine from Beisamun

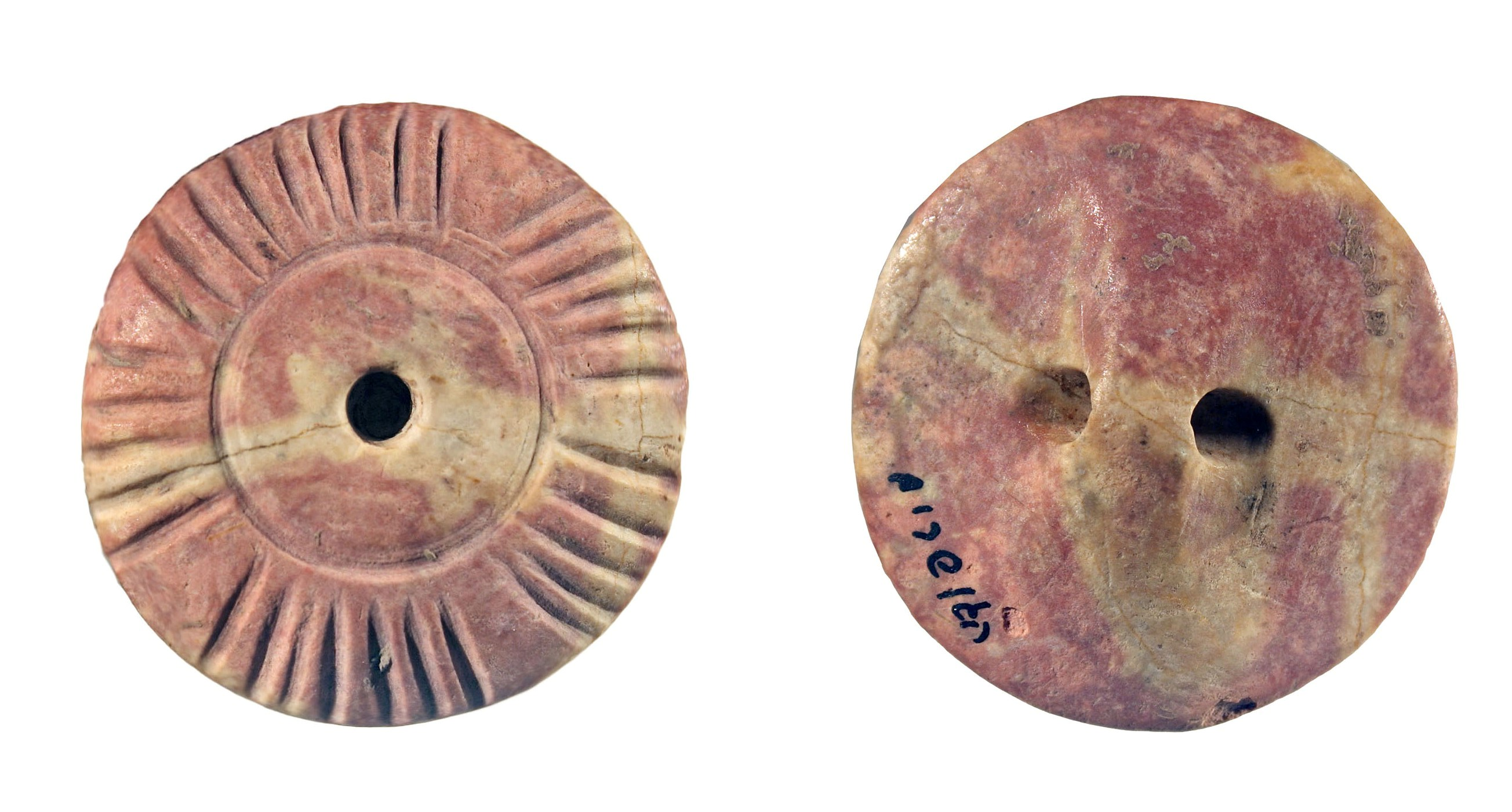
Early Chalcolithic seal from Hagoshrim

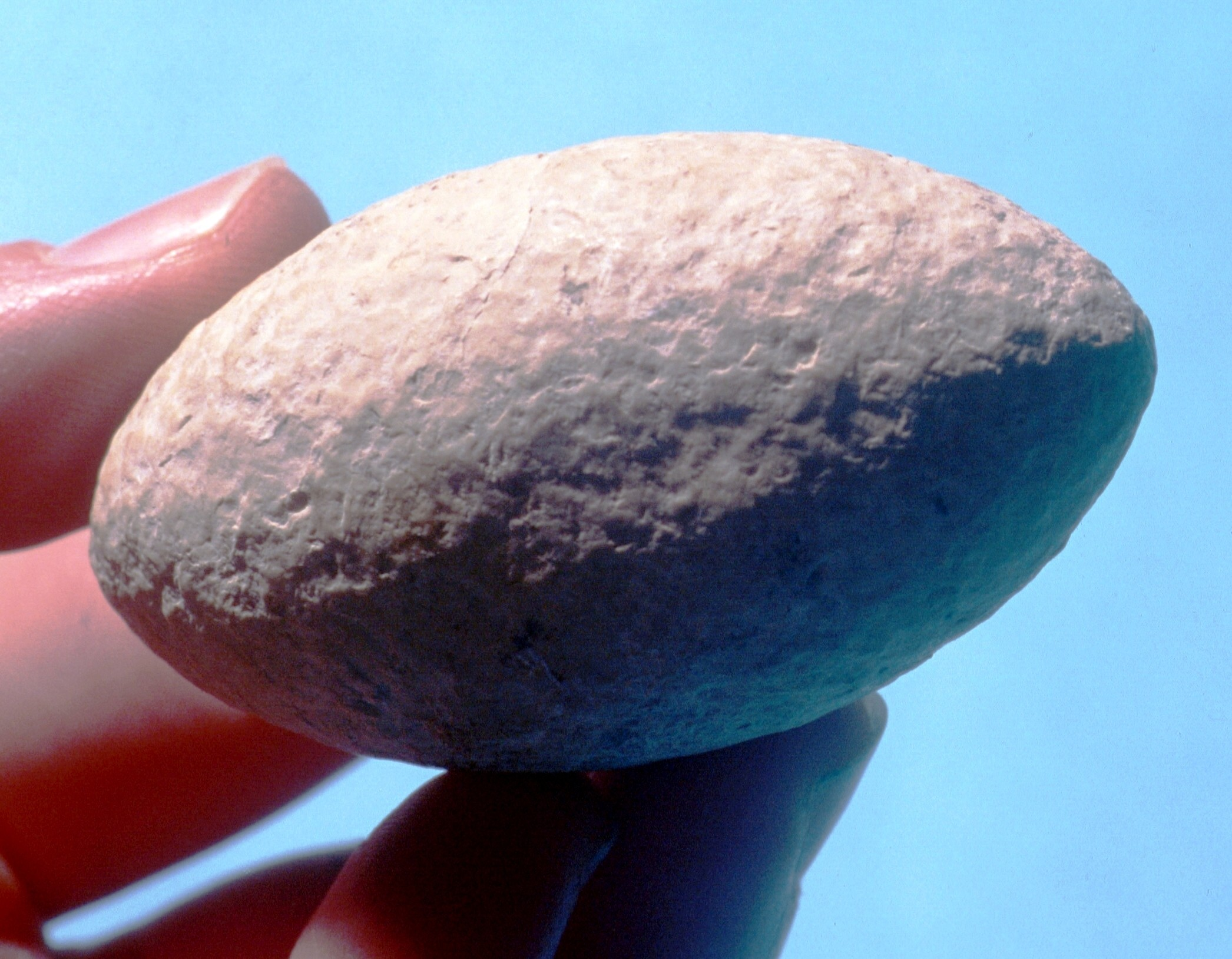
Early Chalcolithic sling stone from Jericho

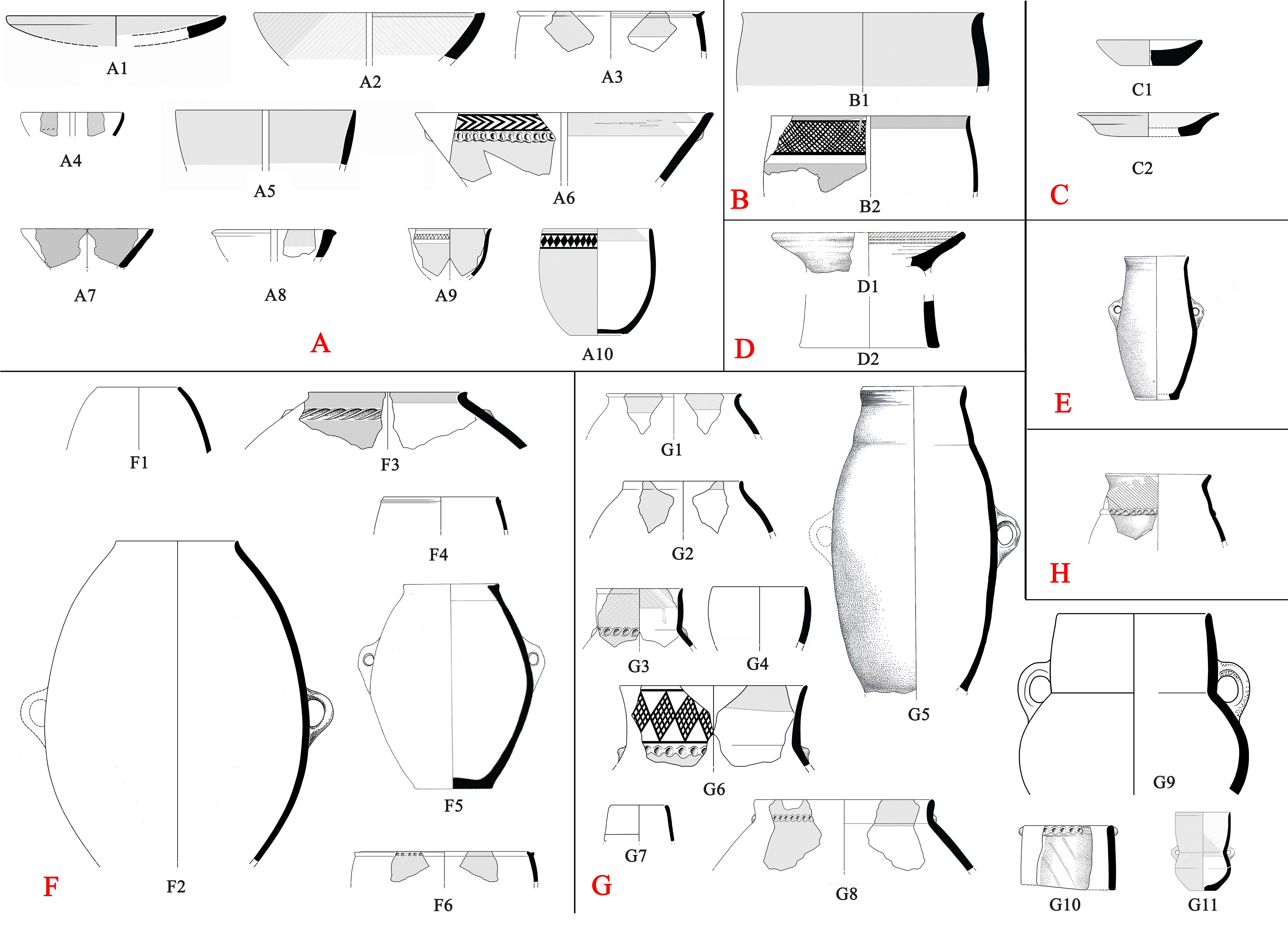
Middle Chalcolithic pottery typology in Israel - Palestine

A Chalcolithic jar burial from Byblos in present-day Lebanon

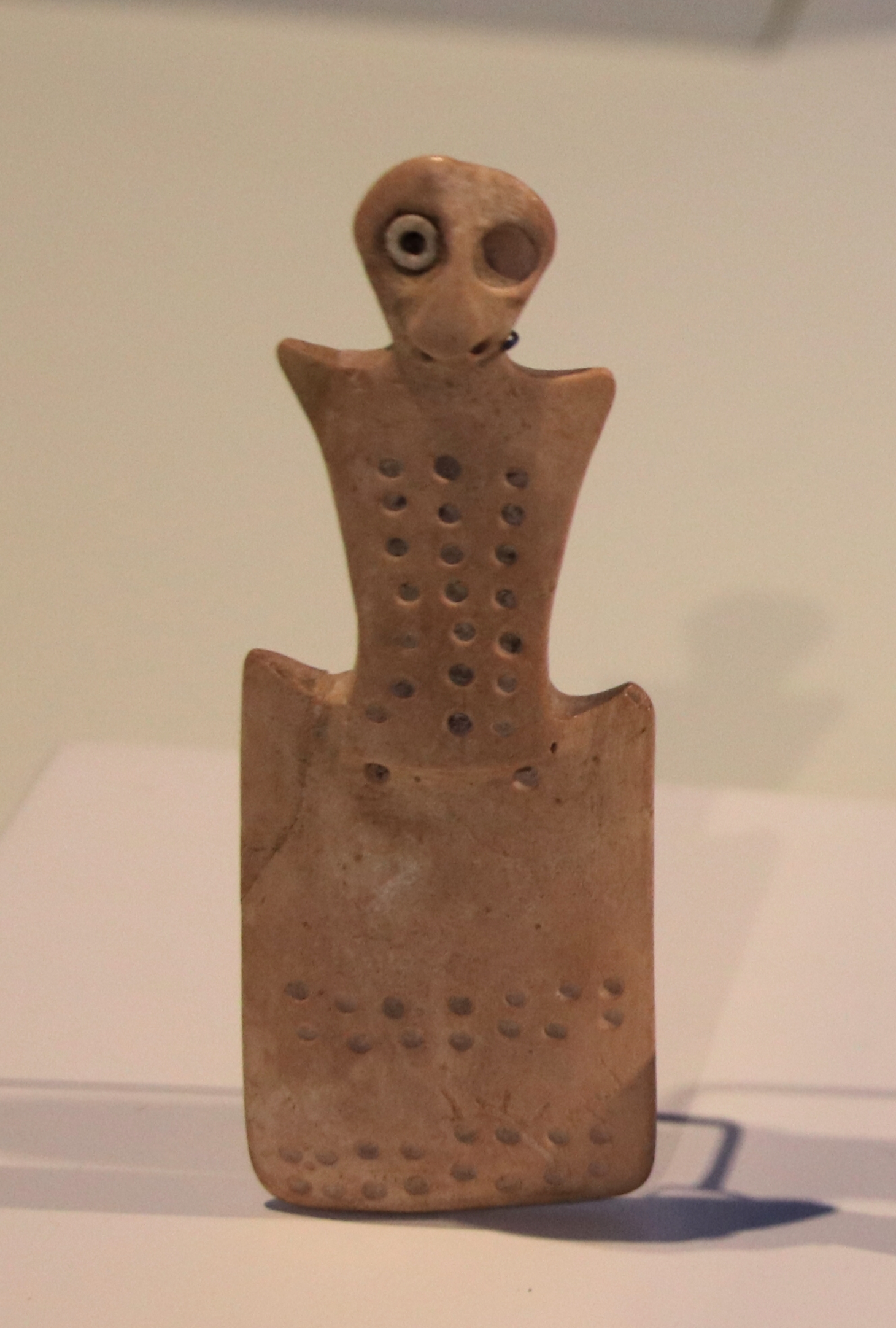
Late Chalcolithic Chalcolithic female figurine

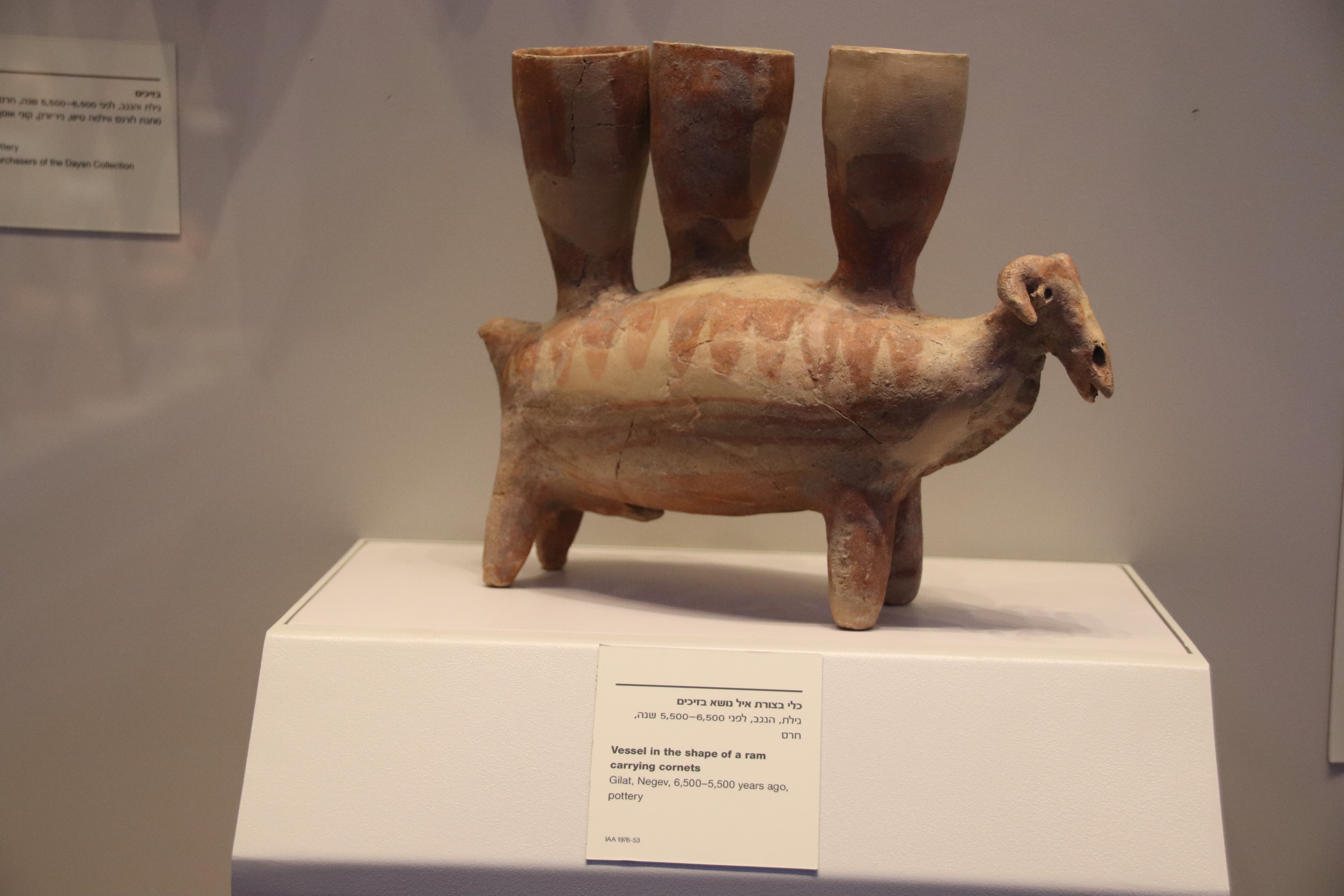
Late Chalcolithic Pottery Vessel of Ram Carrying Cornets, Negev

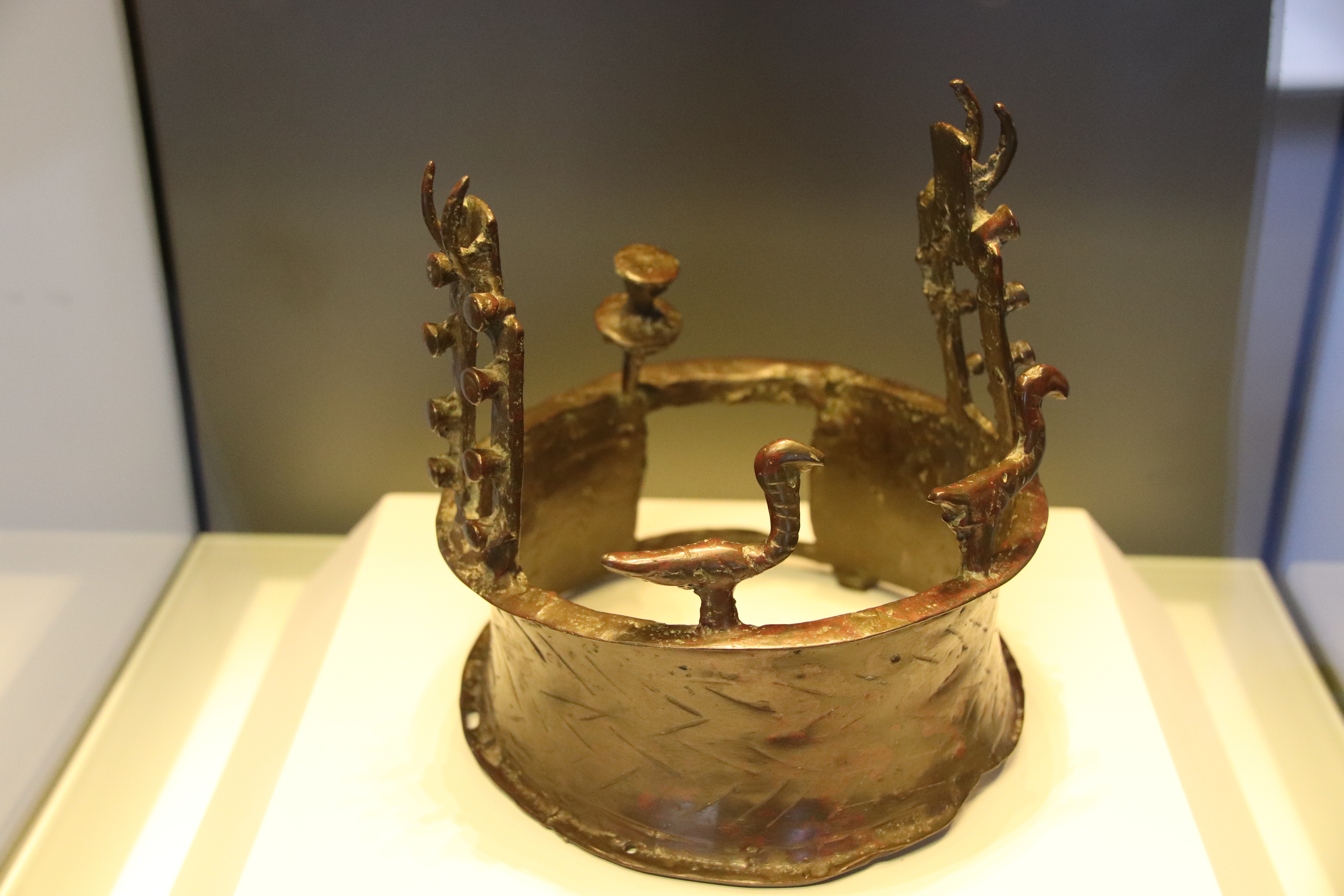
Late Chalcolithic copper crown, made in the lost wax process, from Cave of the Treasures

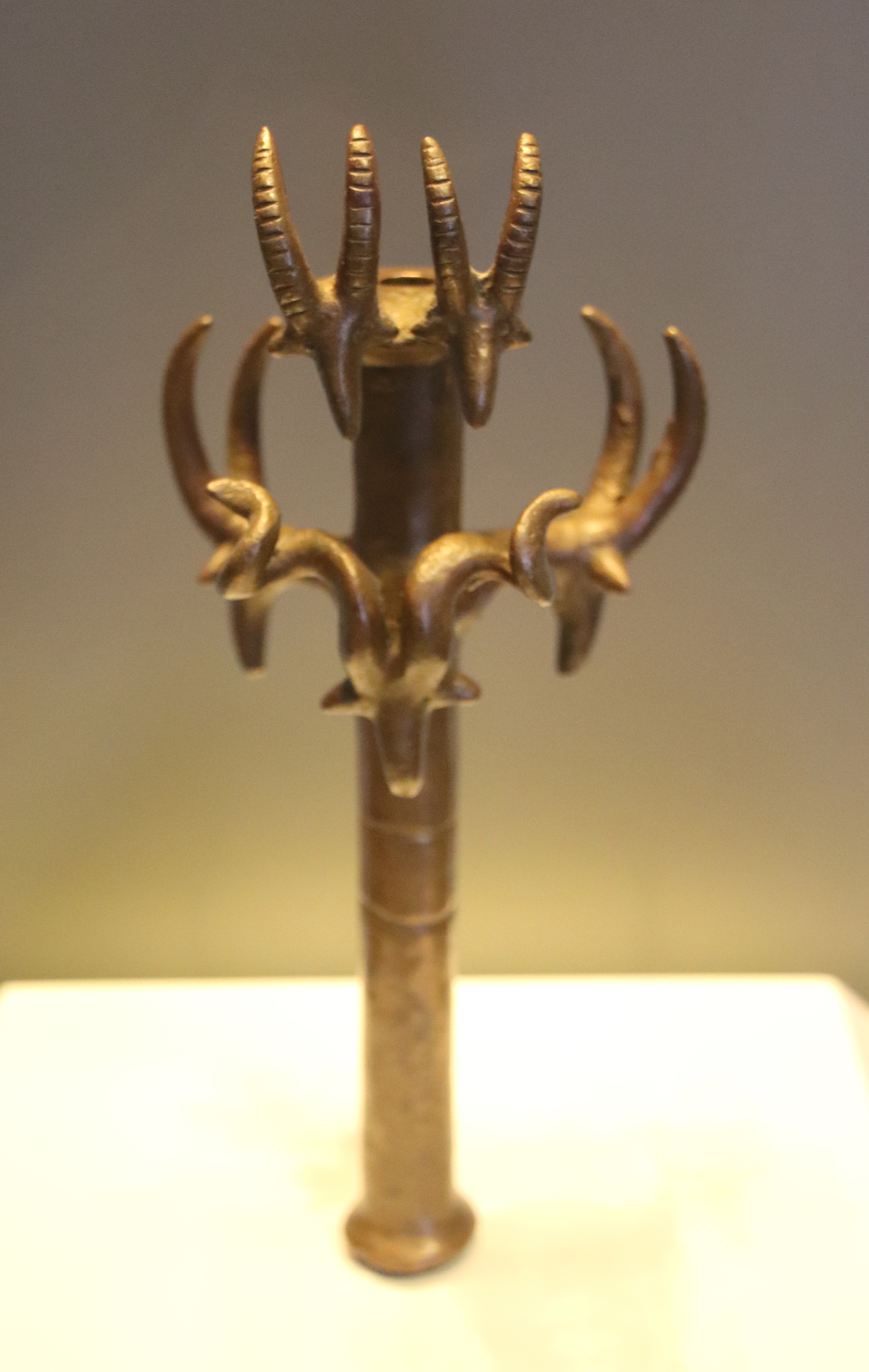
Late Chalcolithic copper goat wand from Cave of the Treasures, Judean Desert

== Contacts with Egypt ==
Sporadic contacts and exchanges between Egypt and the Southern Levant occurred from the time of the Early and sometimes Middle Chalcolithic period. This corresponds to the period of the Badarian culture (са. 4500–3800 BCE) in Upper Egypt. Egyptian potsherds of the period have been excavated in the southern Levant, as well as vast quantities of Nilotic shells (Chambardia acruata) valued for their mother-of-pearl surfaces used to make jewelry, and possibly flint tools and stone palettes which may have been imported or simply influence by Egypt.

During the Late Chalcolithic period (c. 4000–3500 BCE), relations increase between the southern Levant and the Maadi-Buto culture of Lower Egypt and the Naqada I and Naqada II culture in Upper Egypt. Trade in Chambardia acruata shells inceases, and numerous other objects of Egyptian origin are found in the southern Levant, such as flint tools, mace-heads, diorite vessels. In the southern Levant statuettes are also very similar to those of Egypt at that time.

=== Late Chalcolithic ivory objects ===
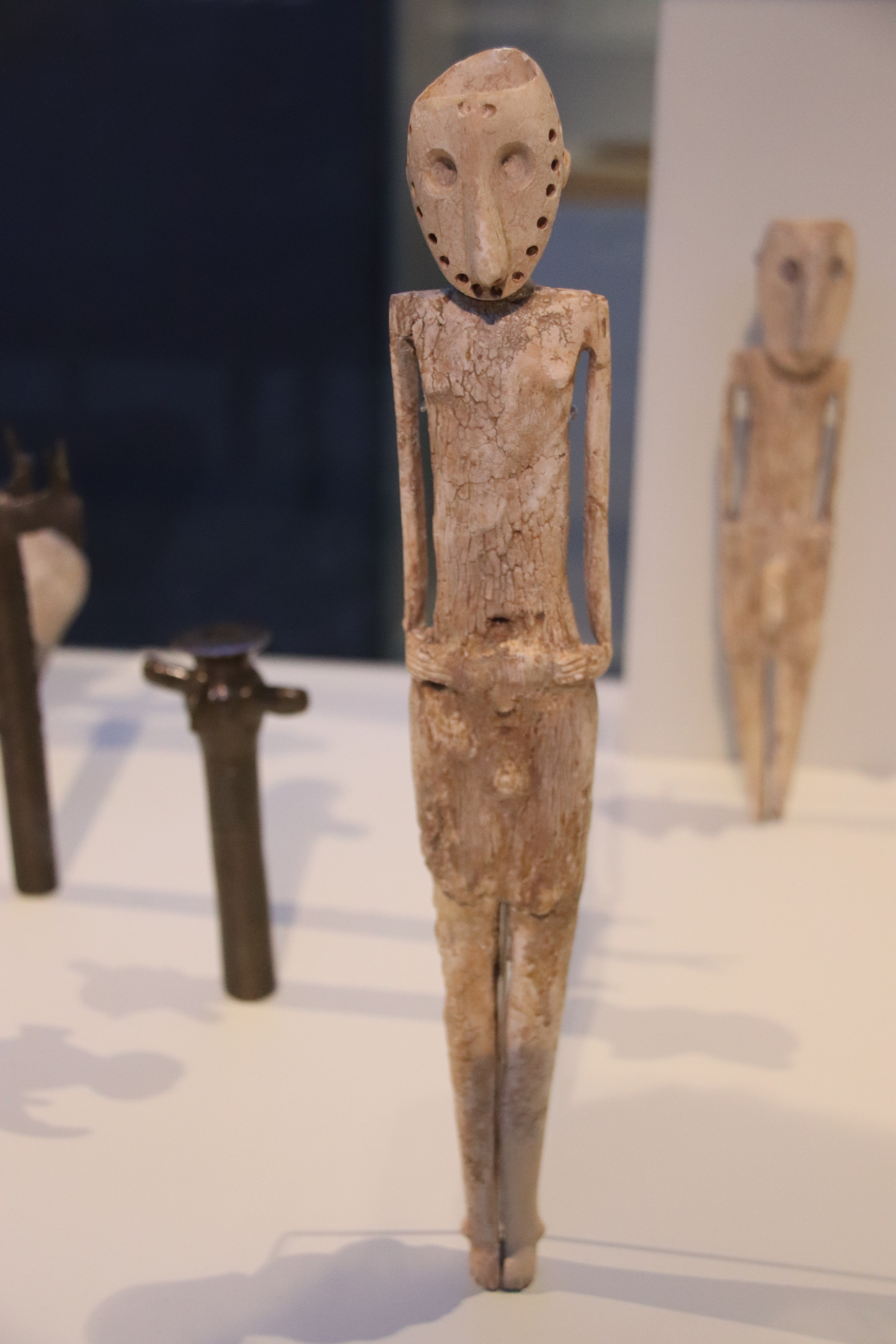
Chalcolithic male figurine, 4500–3500 BCE. Bir es-Safadi.

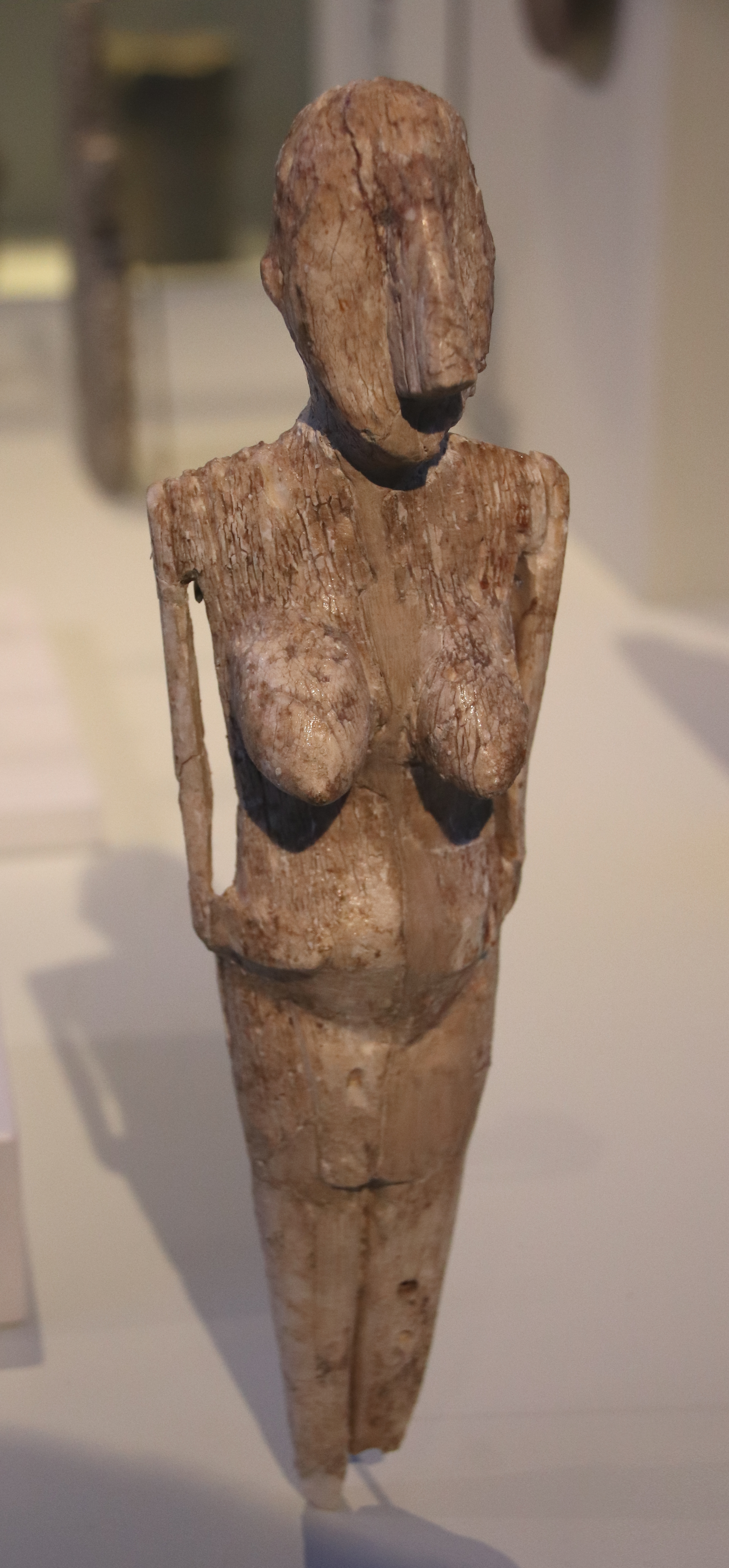
Chalcolithic female figurine, 4500–3500 BCE. Bir es-Safadi.

Various ivory artifacts, originating from the tusks of elephants and hippopotamuses, have been found in areas of the southern Levant. These ivories were likely non-local origin, most likely coming from the Egyptian Nile Valley, and reflect contacts between the southern Levant and Predynastic Egypt. Such items were found in various sites, including Abu Matar, Bir es-Safadi, located in modern Beer Sheva, Shiqmim, Gilat, the Cave of the Treasure in Nahal Mishmar. They were most common in the south, also suggesting an Egyptian origin for the material.

The figures are all naked. Several have hole in their face, probably designed to insert elements depicting facial hair. Holes are designed in place of the eyes, in order to accommodate inlaid eyes, as found in some of the statuettes. The noses are generally long and broad with nostrils. The genitals are clearly shown.

These objects are indicative of contacts between Egypt and the southern Levant, and likely show an effort to emulate Egyptian culture. Predynastic Egypt likely had on influence on Late Chalcolithic cultic and symbolic artifacts. There is a degree of stylistic similarity between these objects and Naqada I statuettes from Egypt. Trade relations are known during this time period, increasing towards the end of the period. Examples are also known of locally-made south Levantine Late Chalcolithic style pottery at Buto in Egypt.

== Genetics ==
Mesopotamian expansions into the Near-East are dated to the Chalcolithic (5000–3300 BCE) and subsequent Bronze age periods, with high proportions of Mesopotamian ancestry found in human samples of this period in the Anatolian and Chalcolithic Levantine regions.

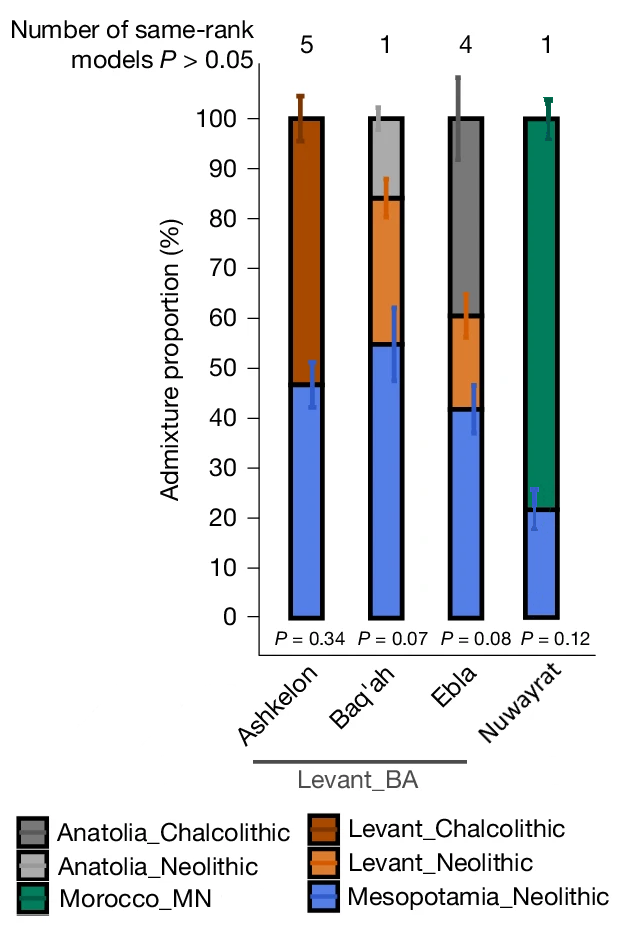
Ancestry proportions of Near Eastern samples

== See also ==
- List of archaeological periods (Levant)

== Sources ==
- Braun, Eliot (2011). "Early interaction between peoples of the Nile Valley and the Southern Levant". Before the pyramids: the origins of Egyptian civilization (PDF). Chicago, Ill: The Oriental Institute of the University of Chicago. pp. 105–120. ISBN 978-1-885923-82-0.
- Garfinkel, Yosef (1999). Neolithic and Chalcolithic Pottery of the Southern Levant. Qedem. Vol. 39. Institute of Archaeology, Hebrew University of Jerusalem. JSTOR 43588816.
- Gilead, Isaac (1988). "The Chalcolithic Period in the Levant". Journal of World Prehistory. 2 (4): 397–443. ISSN 0892-7537.
- Levy, Thomas (2013). "Introduction to the Levant During the Chalcolithic Period: Regional Perspectives". The Oxford Handbook of the Archaeology of the Levant: c. 8000-332 BCE. Oxford: Oxford University Press. pp. 202–211. doi:10.1093/oxfordhb/9780199212972.013.014.
- Morez Jacobs, Adeline; Irish, Joel D.; Cooke, Ashley; Anastasiadou, Kyriaki; Barrington, Christopher; Gilardet, Alexandre; Kelly, Monica; Silva, Marina; Speidel, Leo; Tait, Frankie; Williams, Mia; Brucato, Nicolas; Ricaut, Francois-Xavier; Wilkinson, Caroline; Madgwick, Richard; Holt, Emily; Nederbragt, Alexandra J.; Inglis, Edward; Hajdinjak, Mateja; Skoglund, Pontus; Girdland-Flink, Linus (2 July 2025). "Whole-genome ancestry of an Old Kingdom Egyptian". Nature: 1–8. doi:10.1038/s41586-025-09195-5. ISSN 1476-4687. PMC 12367555. PMID 40604286.
- Rosenberg, Danny; Chasan, Rivka (December 2024). "Ivories in the Late Chalcolithic Period and Their Significance for Understanding Contacts Between Egypt and the Southern Levant". Journal of World Prehistory. 37 (4): 221–256. doi:10.1007/s10963-024-09187-9. hdl:2318/2013031.
- Rowan, Yorke (2013). "The Southern Levant (Cisjordan) During the Chalcolithic Period". The Oxford Handbook of the Archaeology of the Levant: c. 8000-332 BCE. Oxford: Oxford University Press. pp. 223–236. doi:10.1093/oxfordhb/9780199212972.013.016.
- Tristant, Yann; Midant-Reynes, Béatrix (2011). "The Predynastic Cultures of the Nile Delta". Before the pyramids: the origins of Egyptian civilization (PDF). Chicago, Ill: The Oriental Institute of the University of Chicago. p. 50. ISBN 978-1-885923-82-0.
