= Ghassulian =

Chalcolithic culture and archaeological stage

Coordinates: 31°51′39″N 35°38′26″E

- Teleilat el-Ghassul (Levant)
- Geographical range: Southern Levant
- Period: Levantine Chalcolithic
- Dates: c. 4400–3800 BC
- Type site: Teleilat el-Ghassul
- Major sites: Bir Abu Matar; Chalcolithic temple of Ein Gedi
- Preceded by: Wadi Rabah culture
- Followed by: Early Bronze Age (Canaan)

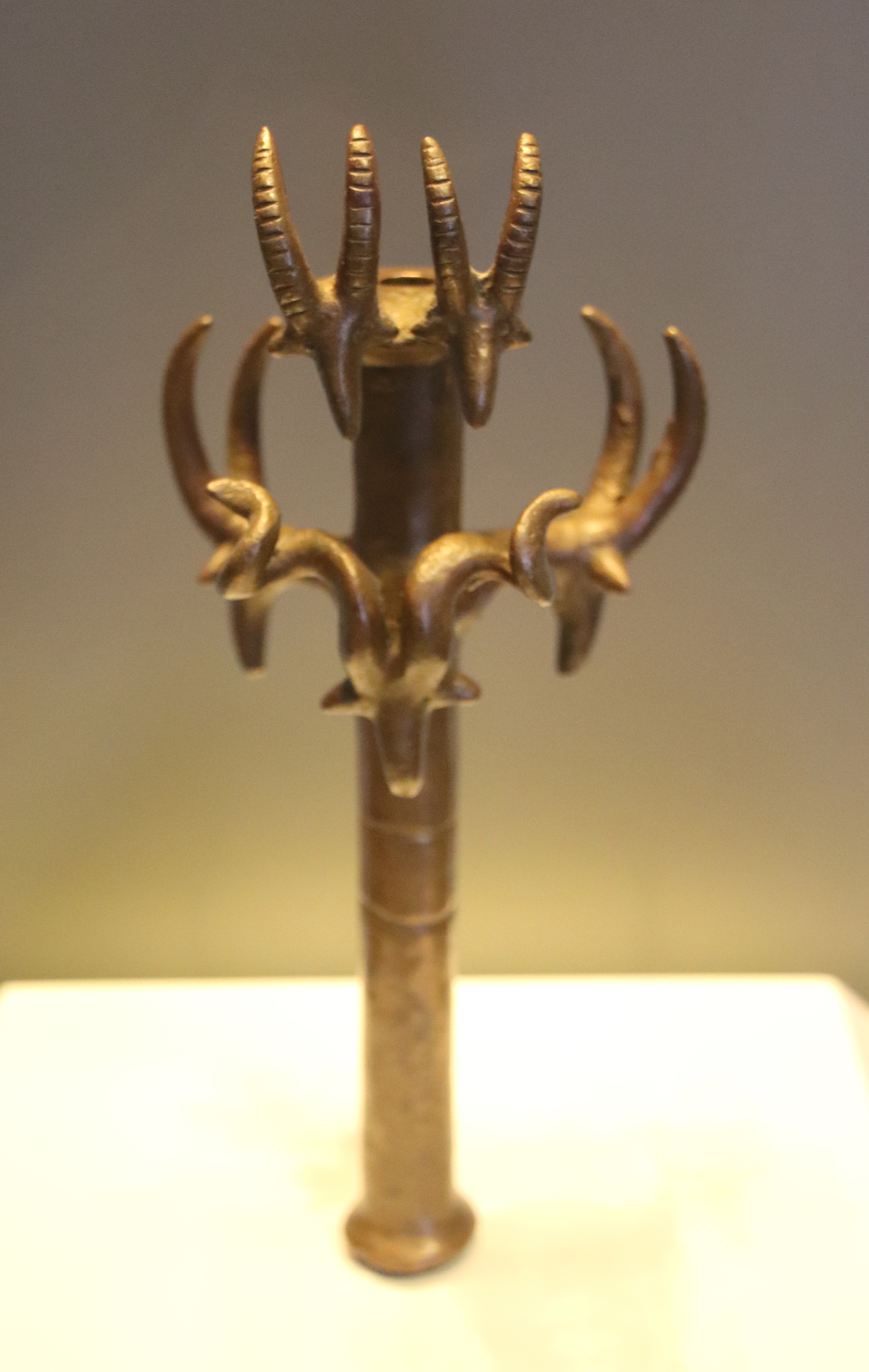
Copper sceptre from the Nahal Mishmar hoard (at Hecht Museum, Haifa)

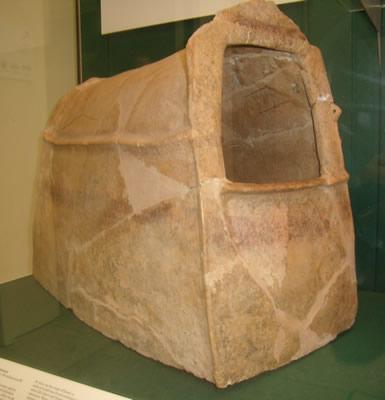
Ghassulian ossuary, ca. 3500 BC, Canaan (at the British Museum)

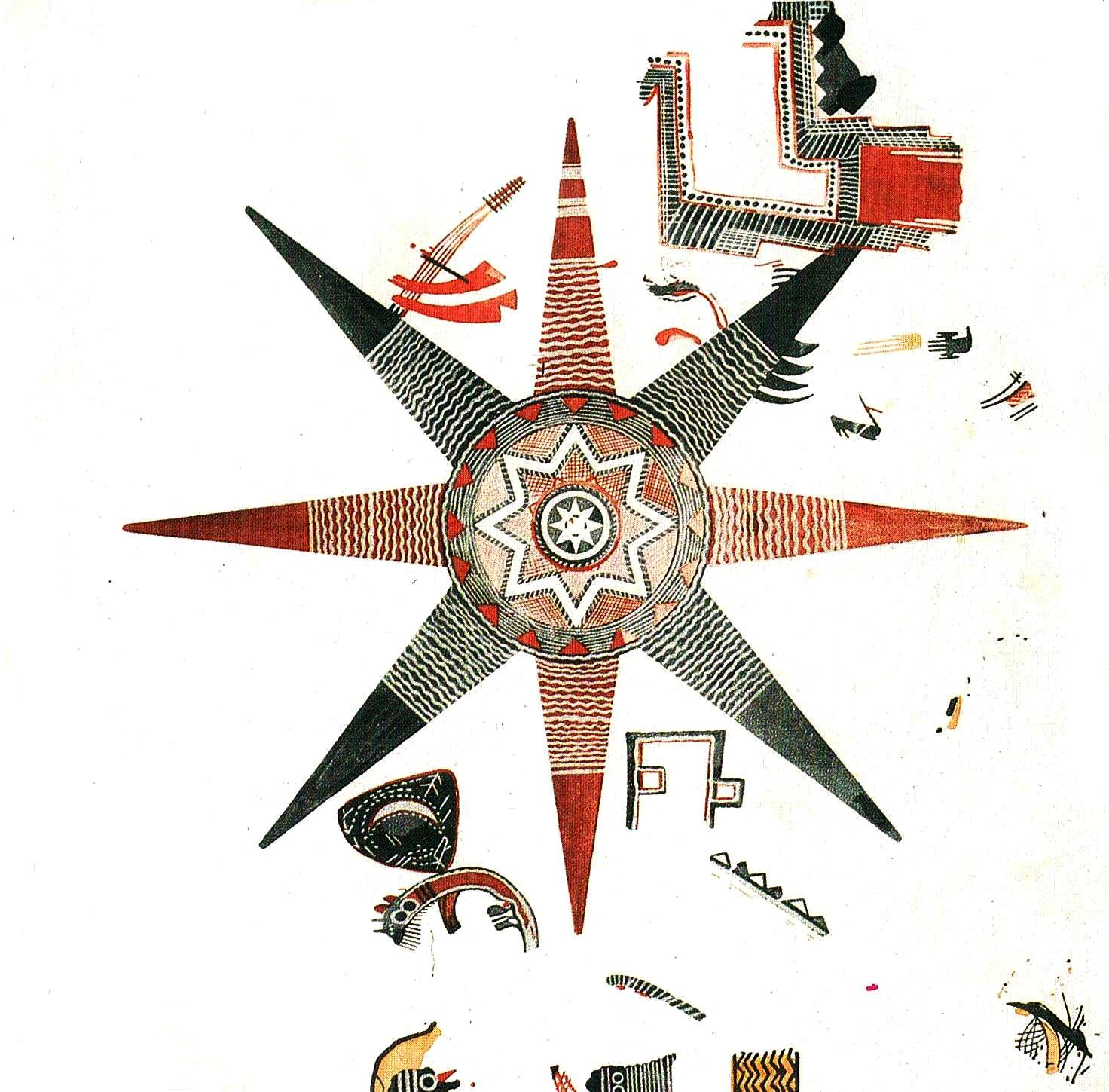
The Ghassulian star

Ghassulian refers to a culture and an archaeological stage dating to the Middle and Late Chalcolithic period in the Southern Levant (c. 4400 – c. 3500 BC). Its type-site, Teleilat el-Ghassul, is located in the eastern Jordan Valley near the northern edge of the Dead Sea, in modern Jordan. It was excavated in 1929-1938 and in 1959–1960, by the Jesuits. Basil Hennessy dug at the site in 1967 and in 1975–1977, and Stephen Bourke in 1994–1999.

The Ghassulian stage was characterized by small hamlet settlements of mixed farming peoples, who had emigrated from the north and settled in the southern Levant: today's Jordan, Israel and Palestinian territories. People of the Beersheba culture (a Ghassulian subculture) lived in underground dwellings, a unique phenomenon in the archaeological history of the region, or in trapezoidal houses of mud-brick. Those were often built partially underground (on top of collapsed underground dwellings) and were covered with remarkable polychrome wall paintings (one of the most notable examples being the 'Ghassulian Star'). Their pottery was highly elaborate, including footed bowls and horn-shaped drinking goblets, indicating the cultivation of wine. Several samples display the use of sculptural decoration or of a reserved slip (a clay and water coating partially wiped away while still wet). The Ghassulians were a Chalcolithic culture as they used stone tools but also smelted copper. Funerary customs show evidence that they buried their dead in stone dolmens and also practised secondary burial.

Settlements belonging to the Ghassulian culture have been identified at numerous other sites in what is today southern Israel, especially in the region of Beersheba, where elaborate underground dwellings have been excavated. The Ghassulian culture correlates closely with the Amratian of Egypt and also seems to have affinities (e.g., the distinctive churns, or “bird vases”) with early Minoan culture in Crete.

== Definition ==
Ghassulian, a name applied to a Chalcolithic culture of the southern Levant, is derived from the eponymic site of Teleilat (el) Ghassul, northeast of the Dead Sea in the Great Rift Valley. The name has been used as a synonym for Chalcolithic in general and sometimes for late phases, associated with late strata at that site and other sites considered to be contemporary. More recently it has come to be associated with a regional cultural phenomenon (defined by sets of artifacts) in what is today the Palestinian territories, and the central area of western Jordan. Other phases of the Chalcolithic, associated with various regions of the Levant, are Qatifian and Timnian (arid zones) and Golanian. The use of the name varies from scholar to scholar.

== Origins ==
The main culture of the Chalcolithic period in Israel is the Ghassulian culture, named after the name of its type-site, Teleilat el-Ghassul, located in the eastern part of the Jordan Rift Valley, opposite Jericho. Afterwards, many additional settlements, located in other archaeological sites, were identified as Ghassulian settlements. All these settlements had been built in areas that had not been previously inhabited, mainly on the outskirts of populated areas. Thus, Chalcolithic settlements have been discovered in the Jordan Rift Valley, in the Israeli coastal plain and on its fringes, in the Judaean Desert, and in the northern and western Negev. On the other hand, it seems that people of the Chalcolithic period did not settle in the mountainous regions of Israel or in northern Israel. Several facts allow us to assume that the carriers of this culture were immigrants who had brought their own culture with them: all excavated sites represent an advanced stage of this culture, whereas no evidence of its nascent stages has been discovered, so far, anywhere in the region. This culture's characteristics indicate that they had connections with neighbouring regions and that their culture had not evolved in the southern Levant. Their origins are not known.

It is hard to determine the time of the Ghassulian settlement in the region, and whether or not they had evolved out of local, pre-Ghassulian, populations (such as the Besorian culture). It could generally be said that most of these settlements date to the 2nd half of the 5th millennium BC, and that they usually existed for only a short period of time, with the exception of Teleilat el-Ghassul, where 8 successive layers of occupation from the Chalcolithic have been excavated, of which 6 are considered Ghassulian; and the earlier, pre-Ghassulian, layers are believed to belong to the Besorian culture. The total depth of these layers is 4.5 meters.

== Ghassulian copper industry ==
The earliest evidence to the existence of a copper-industry in Israel was discovered in Bir abu Matar, near Beersheba, which specialized in copper production and the casting of copper tools and artifacts. No copper ore is naturally available in the area of Beersheba, so it appears that the ore was brought here from Wadi Feynan, in southern Jordan, and possibly also from Timna, where an ancient copper mine was discovered. It was attributed by Beno Rothenberg to the Chalcolithic era.

== Dates and transition phases ==
The Ghassulian, if used as a synonym for the entire Chalcolithic period and not, as more appropriately, just to the Late Chalcolithic, followed a Late Neolithic period and was succeeded by an Early Bronze I (EB I) period. Little is understood of the transition from the latest Chalcolithic to the earliest EB I, but there was apparently some transition of ceramic, flint-knapping and metallurgical traditions, especially in the southern regions of the southern Levant. The dates for Ghassulian are dependent upon 14C (radiocarbon) determinations, which suggest that the typical later Ghassulian began sometime around the mid-5th millennium and ended ca. 3800 BC. The transition from Late Ghassulian to EB I seems to have been ca. 3800-3500 BC.

The Issue of the nature of the transition from the Late Neolithic to the Early Chalcolithic is re-examined in this article [...] The Late Neolithic assemblages are to be closely identified with earlier Neolithic norms, whereas the Early Chalcolithic assemblages display all the hallmarks of the later Classic Ghassulian culture. – S.J. Bourke

== See also ==
Ghassulian sites

- Beit Eshel: Archaeology
- Chalcolithic Temple of Ein Gedi
- Nahal Mishmar, where artifacts possibly originating at the Chalcolithic Temple of Ein Gedi were found

Other

- Levantine archaeology: Syro-Palestinian archaeology
  - Levantine archaeology: Ceramics analysis - history of pottery in the Southern Levant
- Pre-history of the Southern Levant
- Proto-Semitic language: Linguistic homeland

== Bibliography ==
- Bourke, S. J. (1997). The "Pre-Ghassulian" Sequence at Teleilat Ghassul: Sydney University Excavations 1975–1995. pp. 395–417 in H. G. K. Gebel, Z. Kafafi and G. O. Rollefson, eds. The Prehistory of Jordan, II: Perspectives from 1997 (Studies in Early Near Eastern Production, Subsistence, and Environment 4). Berlin: Ex Oriente.
- Bourke, S.; Zoppi, U.; Meadows, J.; Hua, Q.; Gibbins, S. (2004). The end of the Chalcolithic Period in the south Jordan Valley: New 14C Determinations from Teleilat Ghassul, Jordan. Radiocarbon 46/1: 315–323.
- Epstein, C. (1998). "The Chalcolithic Culture of the Golan". Jerusalem: The Israel Antiquities Authority (IAA Reports 4).
- Gilead, Isaac (1988). "The Chalcolithic Period in the Levant". Journal of World Prehistory 2:397-443.
- Gilead, Isaac (1994). "The History of the Chalcolithic Settlement in the Nahal Beer Sheva Area: The Radiocarbon Aspect". Bulletin of the American Schools of Oriental Research 296: 1-14.
- Hitti, Philip Khuri (2004), History of Syria including Lebanon and Palestine, Gorgias Press LLC, ISBN 978-1-59333-119-1
- Joffe, A. H. and Dessel, J. P. (1995). "Redefining Chronology and Terminology for the Chalcolithic of the Southern Levant". Current Anthropology 36: 507–518.
- Klimscha, F. (2009). "Radiocarbon Dates from Prehistoric cAqaba and Other Related sites from the Chalcolithic Period". pp. 363–419 in eds. Khalil, Prehistoric ‘Aqaba I (Orient-Archäologie Band 23). Verlag Marie Leidorf GmbH: Rahden, Westfalia, Germany.
- Levy, T. E. (1986). "The Chalcolithic Period". Biblical Archaeologist 49: 82-108.
- Lovell, J. L. (2001). The Late Neolithic and Chalcolithic Periods in the Southern Levant. New Data from the Site of Teleilat Ghassul, Jordan (Monographs of the Sydney University Teleilat Ghassul Project 1; BAR International Series 974). Oxford: British Archaeological Reports.
- Lovell, J. L. and Rowan, Y. M., eds. (2011). Chapter 2: "Chalcolithic Culture History: Ghassulian and Other Entities in the Southern Levant". pp. 12–24 in Culture, Chronology and the Chalcolithic: Theory and Transition (CBRL Levant Supplementary monograph series Vol. 9). Oxford and Oakville: Oxbow Books.
- Ussishkin, David (1980). The Land Of Israel in the Chalcolithic Era. pp 47–60 in the Hebrew 1980 edition of "History of the Land - Israel", Volume I, edited by Joel Rappel, ISBN 978-9650500504.
