= List of archaeological periods (Levant) =

List of Levantive archaeological periods

The following is a refined list of Levantive archeological periods, expanded from the basic three-age system with finer subdivisions and extension into the modern historical period (note: "BP" = "Before Present"). The particular dates selected as the boundary between ages, as well as the period names for the historical era, are specific to Levantine archaeology and therefore are most accurate for that context. Beginning and ending dates of prehistoric ages are based on the introduction and prevalence of certain technologies, which varied from culture to culture; similarly, historical eras are named after cultures in the area of influence in which the Levant was included. However, archaeologists studying other regions have sometimes found it useful to use the same or a similar system of eras for their topics of research (particularly for prehistoric eras), and thus this list can be used to represent the archaeological periods of areas more general than the Near East.

Stone Age (2,000,000 BP – 4500 BCE)	Paleolithic (2,000,000 BP – 8300 BCE)	Lower Paleolithic	2,000,000 BP – 300,000 BP
Stone Age (2,000,000 BP – 4500 BCE)	Paleolithic (2,000,000 BP – 8300 BCE)	Middle Paleolithic	300,000 BP – 30,000 BP
Stone Age (2,000,000 BP – 4500 BCE)	Paleolithic (2,000,000 BP – 8300 BCE)	Upper Paleolithic	30,000 BP – 12,000 BP
Stone Age (2,000,000 BP – 4500 BCE)	Paleolithic (2,000,000 BP – 8300 BCE)	Epipalaeolithic	12,000 BP – 8300 BCE
Stone Age (2,000,000 BP – 4500 BCE)	Neolithic (8300 BCE – 4500 BCE)	Pre-Pottery Neolithic	8300 BCE – 5500 BCE
Stone Age (2,000,000 BP – 4500 BCE)	Neolithic (8300 BCE – 4500 BCE)	Pottery Neolithic	5500 BCE – 4500 BCE
Chalcolithic (Copper Age) (4500 BCE – 3300 BCE)	Early Chalcolithic		4500 BCE – 4000 BCE
Chalcolithic (Copper Age) (4500 BCE – 3300 BCE)	Late Chalcolithic (Ghassulian)		4000 BCE – 3300 BCE
Bronze Age (3300 BCE – 1200 BCE)	Early Bronze Age (3300 BCE – 2000 BCE)	Early Bronze Age I	3300 BCE – 3000 BCE
Bronze Age (3300 BCE – 1200 BCE)	Early Bronze Age (3300 BCE – 2000 BCE)	Early Bronze Age II	3000 BCE – 2700 BCE
Bronze Age (3300 BCE – 1200 BCE)	Early Bronze Age (3300 BCE – 2000 BCE)	Early Bronze Age III	2700 BCE – 2200 BCE
Bronze Age (3300 BCE – 1200 BCE)	Early Bronze Age (3300 BCE – 2000 BCE)	Early Bronze Age IV	2200 BCE – 2000 BCE
Bronze Age (3300 BCE – 1200 BCE)	Middle Bronze Age (2000 BCE – 1550 BCE)	Middle Bronze Age I	2000 BCE – 1750 BCE
Bronze Age (3300 BCE – 1200 BCE)	Middle Bronze Age (2000 BCE – 1550 BCE)	Middle Bronze Age II	1750 BCE – 1650 BCE
Bronze Age (3300 BCE – 1200 BCE)	Middle Bronze Age (2000 BCE – 1550 BCE)	Middle Bronze Age III	1650 BCE – 1550 BCE
Bronze Age (3300 BCE – 1200 BCE)	Late Bronze Age (1550 BCE – 1200 BCE)	Late Bronze Age I	1550 BCE – 1400 BCE
Bronze Age (3300 BCE – 1200 BCE)	Late Bronze Age (1550 BCE – 1200 BCE)	Late Bronze Age II A	1400 BCE – 1300 BCE
Bronze Age (3300 BCE – 1200 BCE)	Late Bronze Age (1550 BCE – 1200 BCE)	Late Bronze Age II B	1300 BCE – 1200 BCE
Iron Age (1200 BCE – 586 BCE)	Iron Age I (1200 BCE – 1000 BCE)	Iron Age I A	1200 BCE – 1150 BCE
Iron Age (1200 BCE – 586 BCE)	Iron Age I (1200 BCE – 1000 BCE)	Iron Age I B	1150 BCE – 1000 BCE
Iron Age (1200 BCE – 586 BCE)	Iron Age II (1000 BCE – 586 BCE)	Iron Age II A	1000 BCE – 900 BCE
Iron Age (1200 BCE – 586 BCE)	Iron Age II (1000 BCE – 586 BCE)	Iron Age II B	900 BCE – 700 BCE
Iron Age (1200 BCE – 586 BCE)	Iron Age II (1000 BCE – 586 BCE)	Iron Age II C	700 BCE – 586 BCE
Historical periods (586 BCE – present)	Babylonian and Persian periods (Eber-Nari)		586 BCE – 332 BCE
Historical periods (586 BCE – present)	Hellenistic period (332 BCE – 37 BCE)	Early Hellenistic	332 BCE – 167 BCE
Historical periods (586 BCE – present)	Hellenistic period (332 BCE – 37 BCE)	Late Hellenistic	167 BCE – 37 BCE
Historical periods (586 BCE – present)	Roman period (37 BCE – 324 CE)	Early Roman	37 BCE – 132 CE
Historical periods (586 BCE – present)	Roman period (37 BCE – 324 CE)	Late Roman	132 CE – 324 CE
Historical periods (586 BCE – present)	Byzantine period (Diocese of the East)		324–638
Historical periods (586 BCE – present)	Early Arab period (Bilad al-Sham)		638–1099
Historical periods (586 BCE – present)	Crusader and Ayyubid periods		1099–1291
Historical periods (586 BCE – present)	Late Arab period (Fatimid and Mamluk)		1291–1516
Historical periods (586 BCE – present)	Ottoman period (Ottoman Syria)		1516–1917
Historical periods (586 BCE – present)	Modern period		1917–present

== See also ==
- History of the ancient Levant
- List of archaeological excavations by date
- List of archaeological periods - parent page
- Time periods in the Palestine region
