= Chalcolithic temple of Ein Gedi =

Public building in modern-day Israel, dating from about 3500 BCE

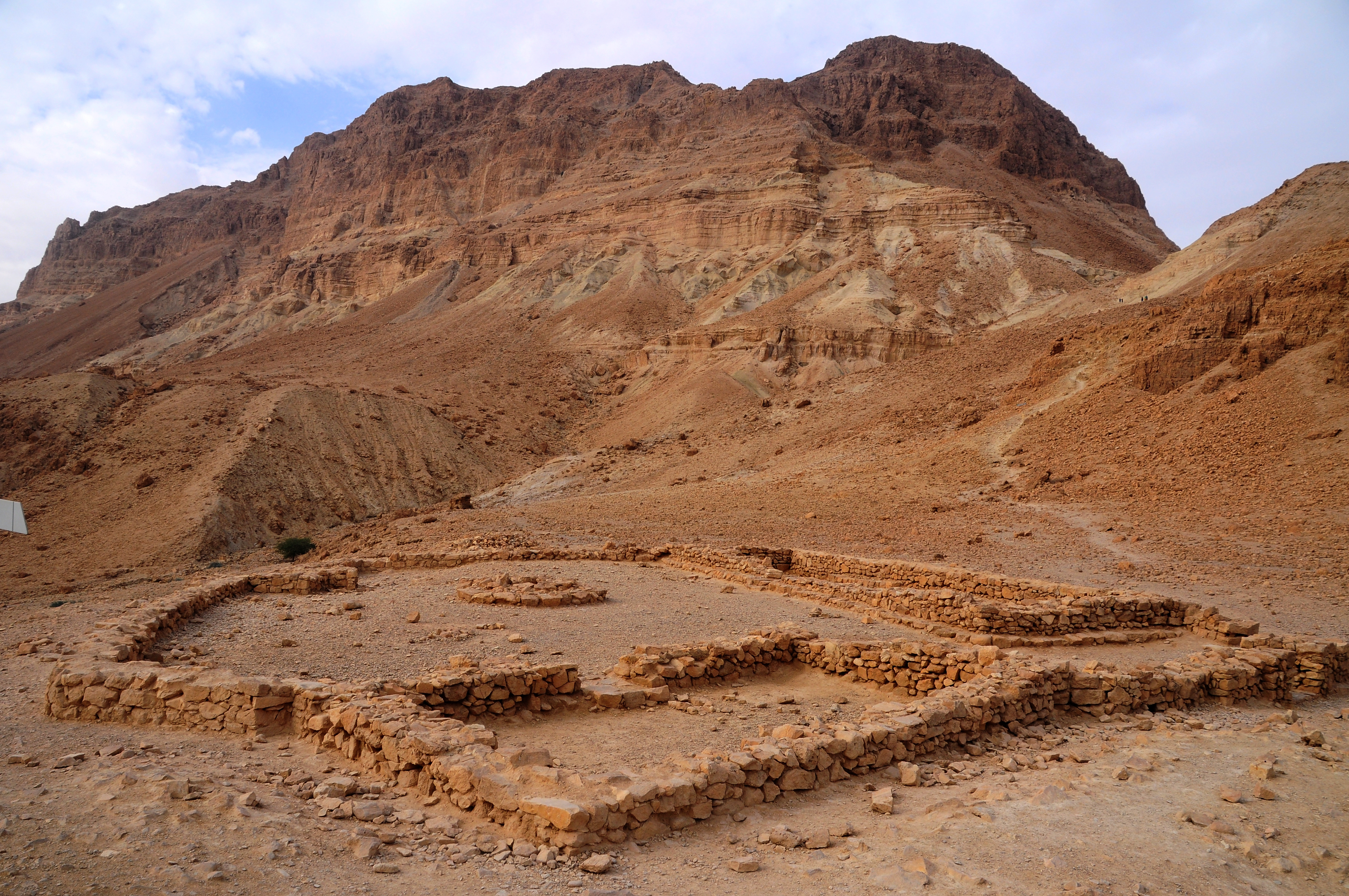
- The temple in 2013

- Location within Israel
- 31.467956°N 35.38922°E
- Type: Temple
- Periods: Chalcolithic
- Cultures: Ghassulian
- Location: Southern, Israel

History
- Built: c. 3500 BC

Site notes
- Material: Stone
- Excavation dates: 1957, 1962, 1964
- Archaeologists: Yohanan Aharoni; Yosef Naveh; Benjamin Mazar
- Discovered: 1956
- Condition: partially restored
- Management: Israel Nature and Parks Authority
- Public access: yes

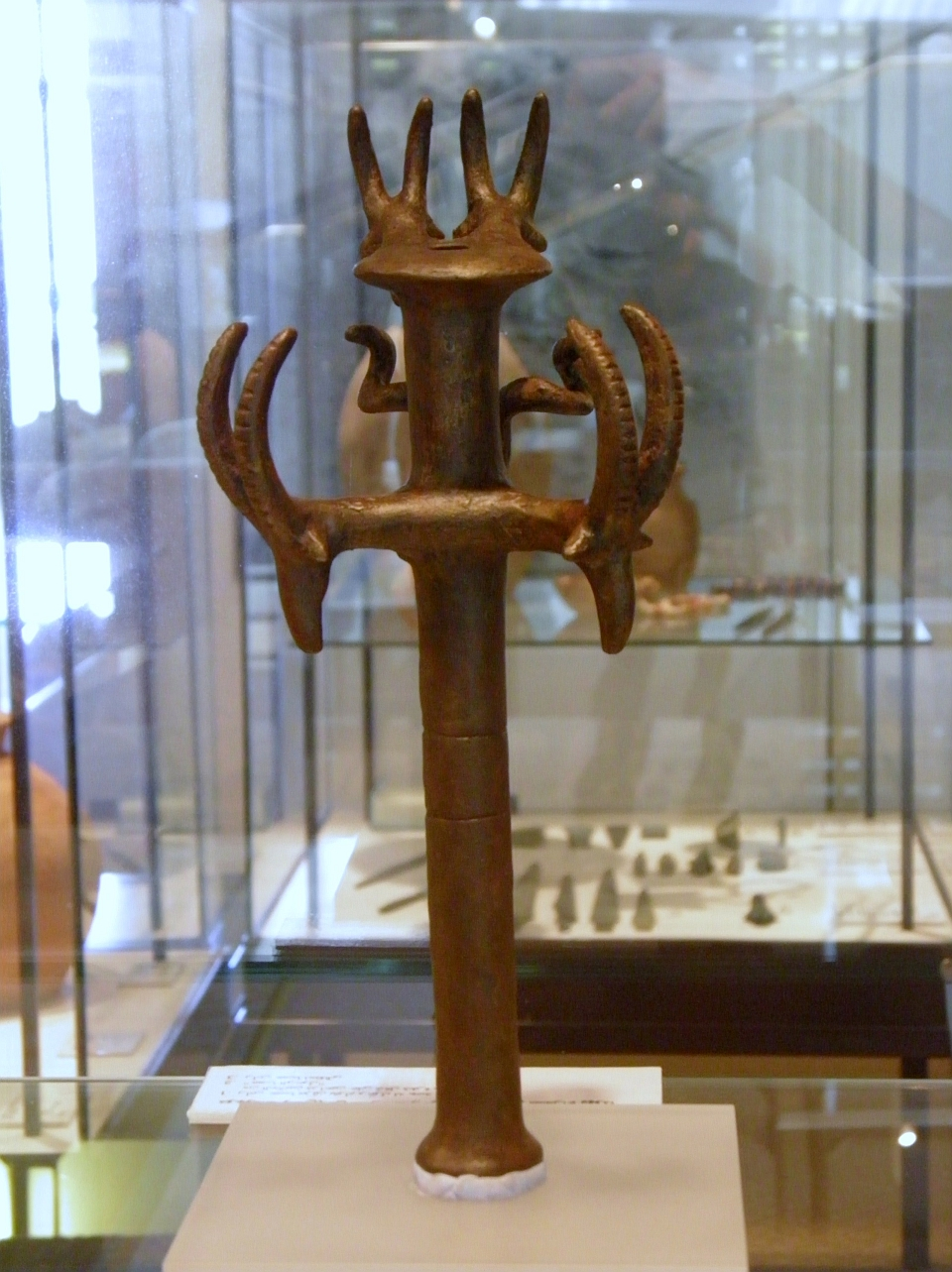
Sceptre from the Nahal Mishmar hoard (replica)

The Chalcolithic temple of Ein Gedi is a Ghassulian public building dating from around 3500 BCE. It lies on a scarp above the oasis of Ein Gedi, on the western shore of the Dead Sea, within modern-day Israel. Archaeologist David Ussishkin has described the site as "a monumental edifice in terms of contemporary architecture".

== Discovery and excavation ==
The temple was discovered in 1956 by Yohanan Aharoni during an archaeological survey of the Ein Gedi region. Yosef Naveh carried out a trial excavation in the following year, finding animal bones, flint flakes, shells, and sherds identifying the site as a public building from the Chalcolithic-Ghassulian period, possibly a shrine. Systematic exploration of the temple started in 1962 under the supervision of Benjamin Mazar, part of the Ein Gedi excavations carried out by the Hebrew University of Jerusalem and the Israel Exploration Society. No domestic ware nor remains of dwellings were found at the site, while its character and plan resemble the Chalcolithic sanctuary found in stratum XIX at Megiddo, confirming its identification as a temple.

== Layout and findings ==
The excavations at the temple site have unearthed a compound consisting of a main building on the north, a smaller one in the east, and a small circular structure, 3 metres (9.8 ft) in diameter and probably serving some cultic purpose, in the center. The entire complex was enclosed by stone walls preserved to a considerable height, linking the buildings into one rectangular unit. In the southern wall stood a gatehouse leading to the spring of Ein Gedi, and a smaller gate in the northern wall, next to the small building, led to another spring in the Nahal David valley. Reaching the cliff walls on three sides, it appears the temple was adapted to the topography.

The main building was a 20 metres (66 ft) by 5.5 metres (18 ft) broadhouse, i.e. it had the entrance in one of its longer walls, in this case the southern wall. Opposite the entrance stood a hoof-shaped niche surrounded by a stone fence. Within were found animal bones, sherds, an accumulation of ashes and the clay statuette of a bull (or ram) laden with a pair of churns. These indicate that the niche served as an altar. A round piece of white crystalline limestone, found at the back of the altar, may have served as the base for a statue of a deity. Stone benches stood along both long walls, while along the short walls the excavators found groups of small pits sunk into the floors. These were found to contain the remains of burnt bones, horns, pottery, and a great quantity of ash. A piece of painted plaster indicates the walls were perhaps even painted and decorated, like those from the Ghassulian type site at Teleilat el-Ghassul.

The smaller building at the eastern end of the enclosure is also a broadhouse, measuring 7.5 metres (25 ft) by 4.5 metres (15 ft). Its floor was found to have been coated with a light-colored plaster and a stone bench was built along its facade. It may have served the priests of the temple, housing their vestments and ritual utensils.

The gatehouse contained an inner and outer entrance, and in the gate chamber stood a stone bench, about nine to twelve inches high (23-30 cm).

The circular installation stands at the highest point in the courtyard and features a round basin, 16 inches (41 cm) in diameter and about 1 foot (30 cm) deep. In the stone wall between the smaller building and the small gate, excavators have uncovered the outlet of a channel which appears to have been used to dispose of liquids, probably water, from the installation. In the installation was also found a fragment of a cylindrical alabaster vessel, the oldest example of alabaster in Palestine. Imported from Egypt, it is indicative of cultural connections between the Ghassulian culture and pre-dynastic Egypt.

== Analysis ==
The location of the temple between two springs, the orientation of the gates and the circular structure in the courtyard indicate the cultic nature of the temple seems to have been connected to water. Pottery found at the site is almost exclusively of four types: bowls on fenestrated pedestals, small bowls, cornets and animal figurines. This limited variety may reflect its cultic significance — bowls on fenestrated pedestals have also been found in the Chalcolithic temple in Megiddo.

The temple complex shows no evidence of various stages of construction nor of repairs, indicating it belongs to one limited period of time. All pottery finds at the site place it in the late Ghassulian stage and have parallels in pottery found in other Chalcolithic sites in the region. With no dwellings and little Calcholithic remains in the immediate vicinity, the site appears to have served as a focus for pilgrimage, serving a wide region. Excavations in the nearby Morinaga cave have yielded domestic Chalcolithic pottery, including bowls, storage jars, cornets and chalices, leading archaeologist Hanan Eshel to believe that the cave had housed the temple priests.

The site shows no sign of deliberate destruction. It appears to have been abandoned and its cultic furniture removed, carried away by the priests. Other Ghassulian sites also display signs of abandonment, and the temple may represent the last phase of the Ghassulian settlements. David Ussishkin has suggested that the Nahal Mishmar hoard, discovered 7 miles (11 km) south of Ein Gedi in 1961 by Pessah Bar-Adon, was in fact the temple's cult objects. Containing 429 articles, 416 of which are copper objects including maceheads, sceptres and small crowns, the hoard forms "a unique collection of equipment for use in the Ghassulian ritual" and must have been used in a central sanctuary. It may have been hidden in Nahal Mishmar because of some calamity or approaching danger, never to be recovered. Nevertheless, there does not exist a single find to directly link the hoard to the temple at Ein Gedi. Bar-Adon has suggested some fragmentary ruins near the cave where the hoard was found might have been a comparable cultic location and a possible alternate source.
