= Nahal Mishmar =

Seasonal stream in Israel's Judaean Desert

Coordinates: 31°22′51.37″N 35°21′51.65″E

Nahal Mishmar (Hebrew: נחל משמר, lit. 'Guard Stream') or Wadi Mahras (Arabic: مَحْرَس) is a small seasonal stream in the Judean Desert in Israel. A hoard of rare Chalcolithic artifacts, the Nahal Mishmar hoard, was discovered in a cave near the stream bed which was dubbed the "Treasure Cave".

== Geography ==
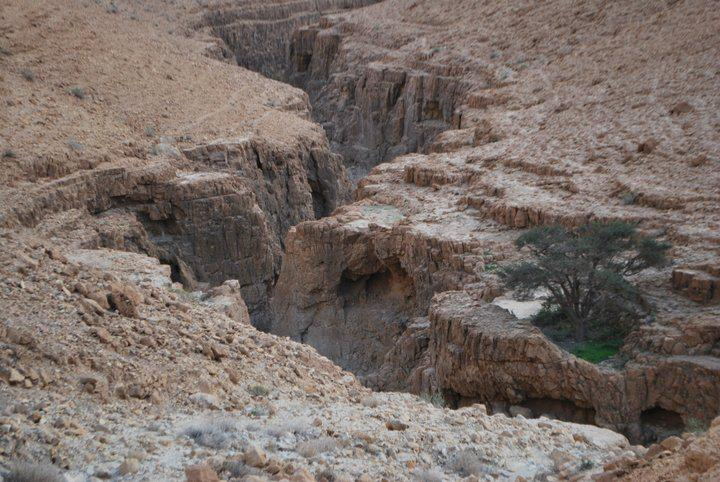
Nahal Mishmar

The valley or wadi of Nahal Mishmar begins in the Hebron Hills, running east towards the Dead Sea. Its western part is shallow, at an altitude of approximately 270 m above sea level, and it proceeds to fall more than 300 meters into the Jordan Rift Valley before emptying into the Dead Sea, over 12 kilometres (7.5 mi). Nahal Mishmar runs north of the Tze'elim Stream, between Ein Gedi and Masada. Access is from Highway 90.

== Archaeology ==
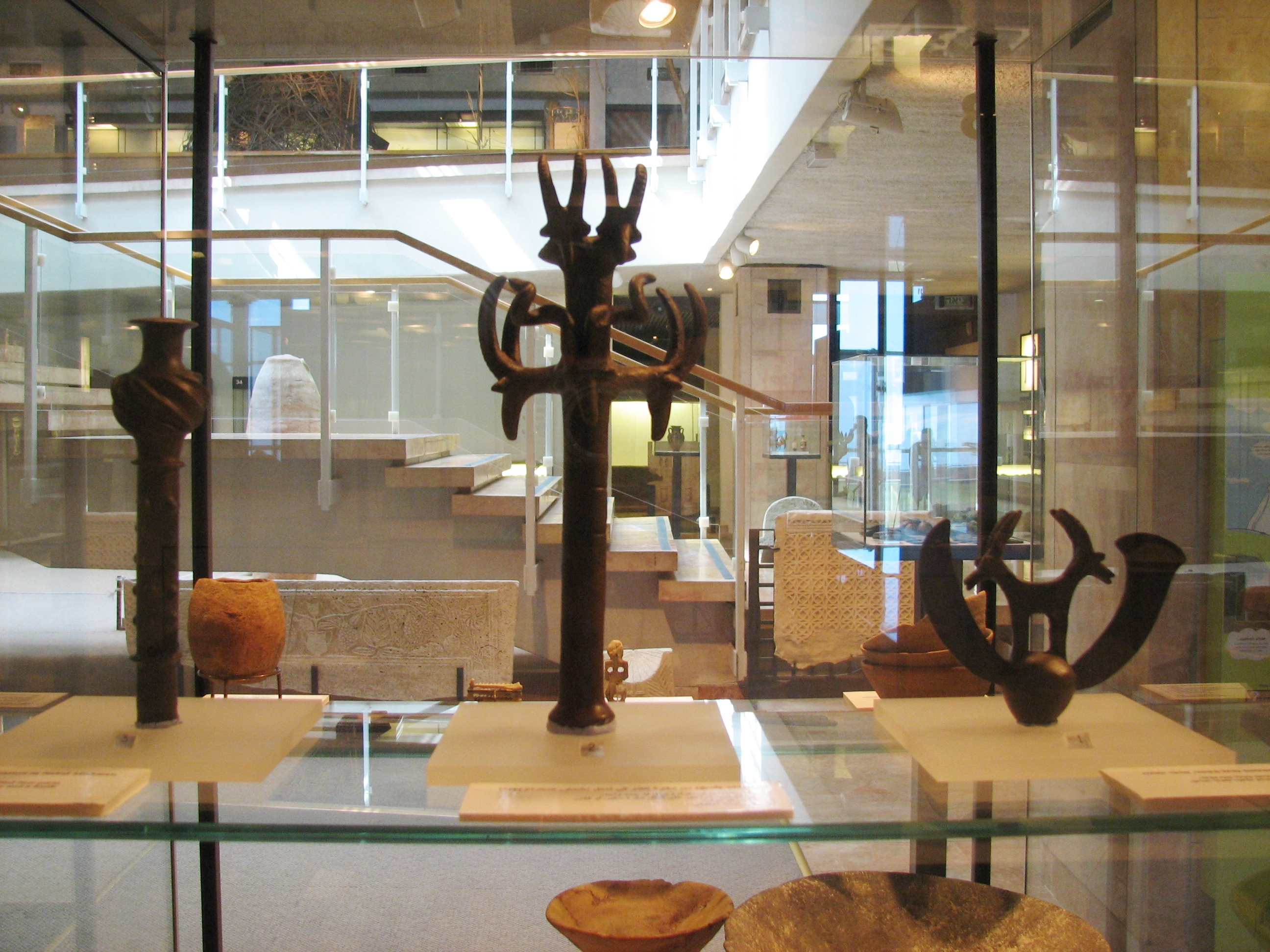
Nahal Mishmar hoard, Hecht Museum, Haifa

In 1961, Israeli archaeologist Pessah Bar-Adon discovered a hoard of Chalcolithic artifacts in a cave on the northern side of Nahal Mishmar, known since as the Treasure Cave. The hoard consisted of 442 decorated objects made of copper and bronze (429 of them), ivory and stone, including 240 mace heads, about 100 scepters, 5 crowns, powder horns, tools and weapons. Archaeologist David Ussishkin has suggested the hoard was the cultic furniture of the abandoned Chalcolithic Temple of Ein Gedi. Prominent finds from the hoard are currently on display in the archaeology wing of the Israel Museum in Jerusalem.

Items in the hoard belong to the Ghassulian culture and the Nahal Mishmar hoard is the only hoard of this culture. It is probable that the copper used for producing them was mined in Wadi Feynan.

Due to the dry climate numerous textile and plaited remains were found at the site. The remains of over 20 individuals were found in the caves. They were members of a sedentary Chalcolithic population who became refugees and their lives ended under tragic circumstances which is indicated by the fact they had numerous injuries and that the wrappings were stained with blood.

Many of these copper objects were made using the lost-wax process, one of the earliest known uses of this complex technique. Carbon-14 dating of the reed mat which was used to wrap the objects points that it was used circa 3500 B.C.E. During this period the use of copper became widespread throughout the Levant which also led to social changes in the region.

== See also ==
- Archaeology of Israel
- List of rivers of Israel
- Punon - site of ancient copper mines in southern Jordan
- Timna Valley - site of ancient copper mines in southern Israel
