= Caves of Faribault =

Cheese company

The Caves of Faribault is an artisan cheese company headquartered in Faribault, Minnesota as a division of Swiss Valley Farms. Utilizing sandstone caves to age cheese, the company makes a variety of raw milk products, including several styles of blue cheese, Gouda, and cheddar.

== History of the business ==
In 1936, the Treasure Cave Cheese Company, the first commercial manufacturer of blue cheese in the United States, opened in Faribault. The company took advantage of natural and man-made riverbank, sandstone caves to mature its products. Treasure Cave helped Minnesota become the key center of blue cheese production during World War II. Although it thrived, beginning in 1965, the company experienced a series of corporate sales and mergers that culminated in 1990 when ConAgra purchased the business and then closed the plant.

In 2001, Jeff Jirik and two former ConAgra employees, incorporated Faribault Dairy Company, Inc., re-opened the plant, and in 2002 brought back the original Treasure Cave blue cheese, now named AmaBlu. The company makes raw milk cheese with locally produced milk tested to insure quality and safety. Several years later, the company began aging other cheese varieties, like cheddar, in the caves. The unique geological characteristics of the sandstone contribute to the aroma and flavor of the cheese.

In 2010, Swiss Valley Farms, an Iowa cooperative of over 640 dairy farm families, purchased Faribault Dairy, renamed it the Caves of Faribault, and Jirik became Vice President of Blue Cheese Operations. The plant now processes about 180,000 pounds of milk a week, yielding approximately 20,000 pounds of cheese.

== Geology ==
At the end of the last ice age, retreating glaciers exposed thick layers of sandstone, known as Saint Peter Sandstone and found predominantly in Illinois, Iowa, Minnesota, and northern Missouri. Glacial rivers cut through the sandstone and created high bluffs, like those found in Faribault, located fifty miles south of Minneapolis, in the Cannon River Valley. One of the Cannon River's tributaries, the Straight River, flows north on the east side of the city, where it cut a hundred-foot high cliff in the Saint Peter Sandstone.

In 1836, Alexander Faribault (1806–1882), after whom the city is named, established a trading post at the confluence of the Cannon and Straight Rivers. Numerous mills for flour, lumber, and wool production were constructed at the rivers' many water falls.

== Brewing and geology ==
Faribault, Minnesota, attracted brothers Ernst and Gottfried Fleckenstein, German immigrants whose family history as brewers dates back to 1577 in Alsace. In 1855, the brothers opened a ten-barrel brewery in St. Paul, Minnesota. Two years later, they moved to Faribault and constructed the Fleckenstein Brewery on the city's east side, along the Straight River and its sandstone cliff. German brewers arriving in the United States brought a different style and production practice in contrast to the predominant English-style ale. The latter is a top-fermented beer, while German lager is a bottom-fermented beer that requires cool temperatures to complete the fermentation process. In Germany, brewers traditionally located lager (German for storage) facilities in caves or deep cellars, where constant cool temperatures prevailed.

The Fleckenstein brothers, recognizing the value of the Saint Peter Sandstone, utilized the existing natural caves in the Straight River bluffs to brew and age beer. In 1872, the brothers ended their partnership and Gottfried Fleckenstein continued the original brewery with his sons. Eventually, the Temperance Movement and strong competition forced the brewery to close in 1902.

== Blue cheese and geology ==
Brewers and cheesemakers have similar environmental requirements to produce and age their products, especially constant temperature and humidity levels. Saint Peter Sandstone provides stable year-round conditions for aging both beer and cheese (52.5 °F. and 99.9% humidity). The structural integrity of the sandstone's arch-shaped natural caverns made construction possible of more extensive caves to age beer and cheese.

In the late 19th and early 20th centuries, a number of American cheese makers developed versions of "foreign type" cheeses with Edam, Gouda, and Swiss the leading varieties. The City of Monroe, Wisconsin, became known as the "Swiss cheese capital of America." Because of World War I's impact on French cheese imports, the U.S. Department of Agriculture conducted research to make a cow's milk "Roquefort" cheese in Pennsylvania. But not until the 1920s did serious investigation begin that linked cow's milk blue cheese to natural cave-aged products.

The University of Minnesota and the cities of St. Paul and Faribault were the innovators in the development of blue cheese in the United States. In 1933, Willes Barnes Combs (1892–1959), professor of dairy science at the University of Minnesota, brought together the earlier USDA research with the potential of using sandstone caves found in a St. Paul region along the Mississippi River known as the "mushroom valley." In 1935, after two years of trials, Professor Combs announced the success of the project and the University of Minnesota launched its Roquefort Cheese Caves. Just after Professor Combs’ debut of the university's cheese, St. Paul newspapers documented the start of a new blue cheese enterprise in Faribault.

Felix Frederiksen (1892–1974), stationed in France during World War I, discovered Roquefort cheese, made from Lacaune sheep's milk and aged in natural limestone Combalou caves of Roquefort-sur-Soulzon. After World War I, Frederiksen pursued his dream to make American Roquefort-style cheese by becoming a food scientist and "research chemist for Pabst Farms, the cheese division of Pabst Brewing Company during Prohibition." Beginning in 1923, Pabst made "Pabst-ett processed cheese spread" and aged the cheeses in its brewery cellars, now empty of beer barrels. While at Pabst, Frederiksen created several patents for whey-based processed cheese (similar to Kraft Foods Inc. Velveeta), the basic ingredient for Pabst-ett. At its height, the company produced 8,000,000 pounds annually.

After Repeal of Prohibition in 1933, Pabst sold the division to Kraft and Frederiksen became the supervisor of the company's experimental blue cheese program. After the initiative ended, Frederiksen continued work to create an American blue cheese that used natural caves in which to age cheese. In the mid-1930s, Fredricksen and his wife Dorothy traveled through Iowa and Minnesota seeking the perfect site to make, age, and store blue cheese.

In 1935, the Frederiksens, arriving in Faribault, purchased the former Fleckenstein Brewery property and established Treasure Cave Cheese Company. Although the University of Minnesota launched the first prototypes, it was Frederiksen's opening of Treasure Cave Cheese Company in 1936 that created the first commercial blue cheese production in the United States.

The arched caves, combined with the purity of Saint Peter Sandstone (99.9% pure quartzite) and its slightly acidic characteristic, enabled Treasure Cave Cheese Company to create a unique ageing environment. The slight acidity helps mitigate unwanted bacteria and yeasts, while water molecules easily pass horizontally and vertically through the stone and transport ammonia to the exterior environment. "The face of the bluff that covers the cave is constantly being heated and pulling out moisture, creating a slow movement of water from the cave interiors back to the outside world."

In 2001, after Faribault Dairy reopened the caves, they started to clean the sandstone and discovered some high ceiling corners contained different colored surfaces, molds and yeasts related to the previous beer and cheese businesses. The micro-organisms were not removed and their presence contributes to the unique characteristics and qualities the company's products.

== Awards ==
Since 2001, the company has received numerous state, national, and international awards and recognitions. Most recently these include the 2014 Good Food Awards: Jeffs' Select Gouda and St. Pete's Select Blue Cheese, and 2013 Specialty Food Association's Specialty Outstanding Food Innovation: Jeffs' Select for Outstanding Cheese or Dairy Product.
