= Dorothy Bar-Adon =

American-born Israeli journalist (1907–1950)

- דורותי בר-אדון
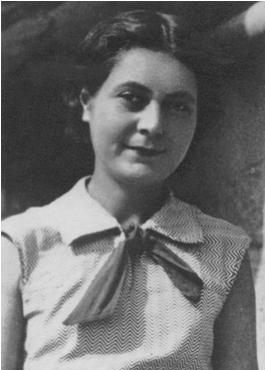
- Dorothy Kahn Bar-Adon
- Born: Dorothy Kahn; 2 August 1907; Philadelphia, Pennsylvania, United States
- Died: 7 August 1950 (aged 43); Merhavia, Israel
- Other names: Dot Kahn; Dorothy R. Kahn
- Occupation: Journalist
- Known for: Journalism for The Palestine Post
- Spouse: Pessah Bar-Adon
- Children: Doron Bar-Adon

Dorothy Bar-Adon (Hebrew: דורותי בר-אדון; August 2, 1907 – August 7, 1950) was an American-born Israeli journalist. Her early experience as a correspondent was gained on The Atlantic City Press. From her immigration to Mandatory Palestine in 1933 until her death, she worked as a journalist for The Palestine Post (later The Jerusalem Post), covering a wide range of international and domestic issues. She died at 43.

== Early life and career in the United States ==
Dorothy Bar-Adon (née Kahn) was born in Philadelphia, Pennsylvania, United States, on August 2, 1907; she was raised in a Reform Judaism milieu. During her childhood, the family moved to the seaside resort of Atlantic City, New Jersey. When she was 16 years old, her father died, leaving the family without its main breadwinner. On completing her high school education, Bar-Adon went to work as a staff reporter for The Atlantic City Press. Writing under the by-lines Dot Kahn, Dorothy Kahn and Dorothy R. Kahn, Member of the Press Staff or Staff Correspondent, Bar-Adon was employed by the newspaper until her immigration to Palestine in 1933.

During her years at the Press, Bar-Adon's writing seems to have found favor with her editors: many of her stories were placed on the paper's opening pages and bore her by-line. While much of the paper's national and international news was provided by the Associated Press, Bar-Adon often covered stories of international interest when assigned to interview visitors to Atlantic City who had a connection to issues of the day.

Following the 1929 Palestine riots, 1930 saw two events initiated by the authorities of the British Mandate of Palestine which threatened to limit Jewish immigration: the Hope-Simpson report recommended limiting Jewish immigration to Palestine according to the perceived ability of the territory to absorb immigrants. On October 21, 1930, Sidney James Webb, Lord Passfield, Secretary of State for the Colonies, issued a White Paper restricting further land acquisition by Jews, thus slowing Jewish immigration. Page two of the Press's November 6, 1930, edition features a by-lined article by Bar-Adon headlined "Resort Jews Resent British Palestine Edict: Pass Resolutions Condemning Act; Rabbi Neuman and Rev. Mellen Speak". The article describes an interfaith meeting held at a local community center the previous evening to protest the British government's recent issuing of the Second White Paper.

== Career in Palestine/ Israel ==
In 1933, Bar-Adon left for Palestine after a busy fortnight in New York. Since Mandatory Palestine was part of the British Empire, she spent much of her time in the city on the complicated process of obtaining a visa for Palestine from the British Consulate, as well as in collecting letters of recommendation from people who might be able to assist in smoothing her first steps in Palestine. Rabbi Stephen Samuel Wise provided Kahn with letters of introduction to, among others, Henrietta Szold, David Yellin, Irma Lindheim and Gershon Agron of The Palestine Post.

In June 1933, Bar-Adon arrived in Tel Aviv; she wrote at length about the young, burgeoning city, then undergoing an influx of Jewish immigrants from Germany who had concluded that the rise of the Nazi Party to power was a threat to be taken seriously. Bar-Adon was not fluent in Hebrew during her first years in Palestine; she thus began to write for the English-language Palestine Post.

From her arrival in Palestine in 1933 until 1936, Bar-Adon lived in Tel Aviv and Jerusalem, while serving as a correspondent for the Post and writing her autobiography Spring Up, O Well, which was published in 1936 by Henry Holt and Co. In spite of perceived dangers concomitant with the 1936–39 Arab revolt in Palestine, Bar-Adon travelled throughout the countryside and wrote prolifically of the new and not-so-new cooperative villages: the moshav and the kibbutz. She also met and wrote about members of local Arab communities. In 1934 she covered the marriage of Talal of Jordan, father of King Hussein of Jordan. From 1936 until 1938 Bar-Adon lived in Kibbutz Givat Brenner, while also spending time in Jerusalem. In 1938 the Post sent her to Poland, where she investigated and wrote about the place of the Jews as a minority in Eastern Europe.

In 1939, Bar-Adon met her future husband, the archaeologist Pessah Bar-Adon. She continued her work as a journalist, both for the Post and free-lance. On August 17, 1940, their only son, Doron, was born. In 1943, the Bar-Adon family moved to the moshav Merhavia, contiguous with Kibbutz Merhavia, where they lived until Dorothy's death. The closeness of the two settlements, as well as her previous experience as a resident of Kibbutz Givat Brenner, enabled Bar-Adon to contrast the two forms of cooperative communities—kibbutz and moshav—from the stance of homemaker and mother. Her writing on the subject is non-partisan, and this at a time when public debate about the various forms of cooperative settlement in Palestine tended to be highly partisan.

== A journalist on the periphery ==
During the last decade of her life, she wrote of daily life in the Jewish cities and villages during World War 2; of the massive immigration of European Jewry to Palestine in the years immediately following the war's end; of the often successful attempts by the British Mandatory authorities to arrest and detain these immigrants in the Displaced Persons camp in Cyprus; of the events leading to the establishment of the State of Israel in 1948; of the 1948 Arab-Israeli War; of the war's end and the beginning of the building of a civil state. Bar-Adon continued to cover the central events of the day under the persona of a Jewish, Palestinian/ Israeli housewife residing in the agricultural heartland. Simultaneously, from the same stance, she wrote of daily life in the villages and kibbutzim.

In addition to her work as a staff reporter for The Palestine Post, Bar Adon was a regular contributor to such journals as The Jewish Advocate, The National Jewish Post, Palestine Review, The Journal of Jewish Life and Letters. She also composed publicity for a broad range of Jewish organizations in Israel and abroad, among them Hadassah, Magen David Adom, Youth Aliyah, the Zionist Organization Youth Department.

In July 1950, Bar-Adon became ill. She was found to be suffering from kidney disease, characterized by uremia; at the time such conditions were incurable. She died on August 7, 1950. Dorothy Kahn Bar-Adon is buried in the small cemetery adjoining the village of Merhavia.

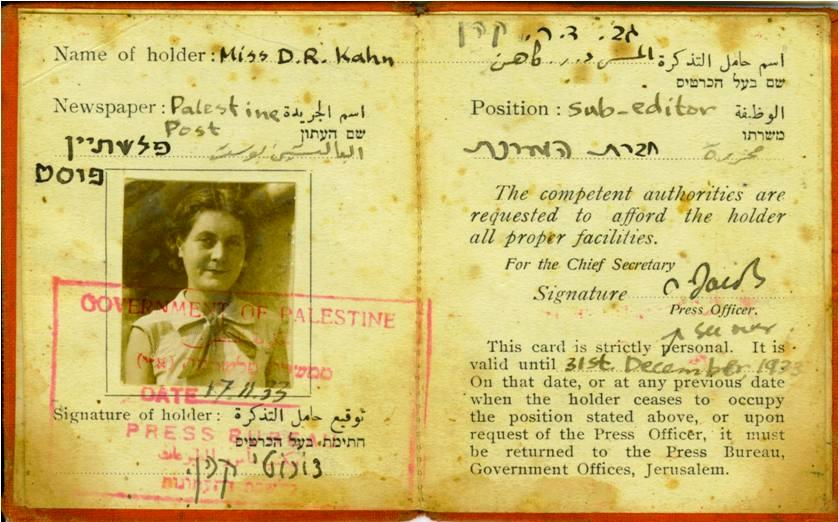
Bar-Adon's press card

== References and bibliography ==
- Bar Adon, Doron. My Parents’ Garments, published by the author, Israel: 2005 [Hebrew]
- Bar Adon, Dorothy and Pesach, Seven Who Fell, Tel Aviv, 1947
- Bar Adon, Dorothy, The Twin Villages of Merhavia, Tel Aviv, 1948
- Bar Adon, Dorothy Kahn, Writing Palestine 1933-1950: Dorothy Kahn Bar-Adon, Esther Carmel Hakim, Nancy Rosenfeld, eds., Boston, 2016.
- Beasley, Maurine, and Gibbons, Sheila J. Taking Their Place: A Documentary History of Women and Journalism, State College PA, 2003.
- Board, Barbara, Reporting from Palestine 1943–1944, UK, 2008
- Chambers, Deborah; Steiner, Linda; Fleming, Carole, Women and Journalism, New York, 2004
- Hyman, Paula; Ofer, Dalia, eds., Jewish Women: A Comprehensive Historical Encyclopedia (CD ROM)
- Kahn, Dorothy, Spring Up O Well, London, 1936; New York, 1938
- Lewis, Norman, "From Cheesecake to Chief: Newspaper Editors' Slow Acceptance of Women," American Journalism, (2008) 25:2, 33-55
- Lutes, Jean Marie, Front Page Girls: Women Journalists in American Culture and Fiction, 1880–1930, Ithaca and London, 2006.
- Reinharz, Shulamit, Jewish Women and the Zionist Enterprise, Boston, 2005.
- Elyada, Ouzi, "A Female Journalist Reporter in the 1930s Palestine : Dorothy Kahn Bar-Adon and the Palestine Post", Media History, 2024, online article, http://doi.org/10.1080/13688804.2024
