= Nahal Mishmar hoard =

Archaeological find in Israel

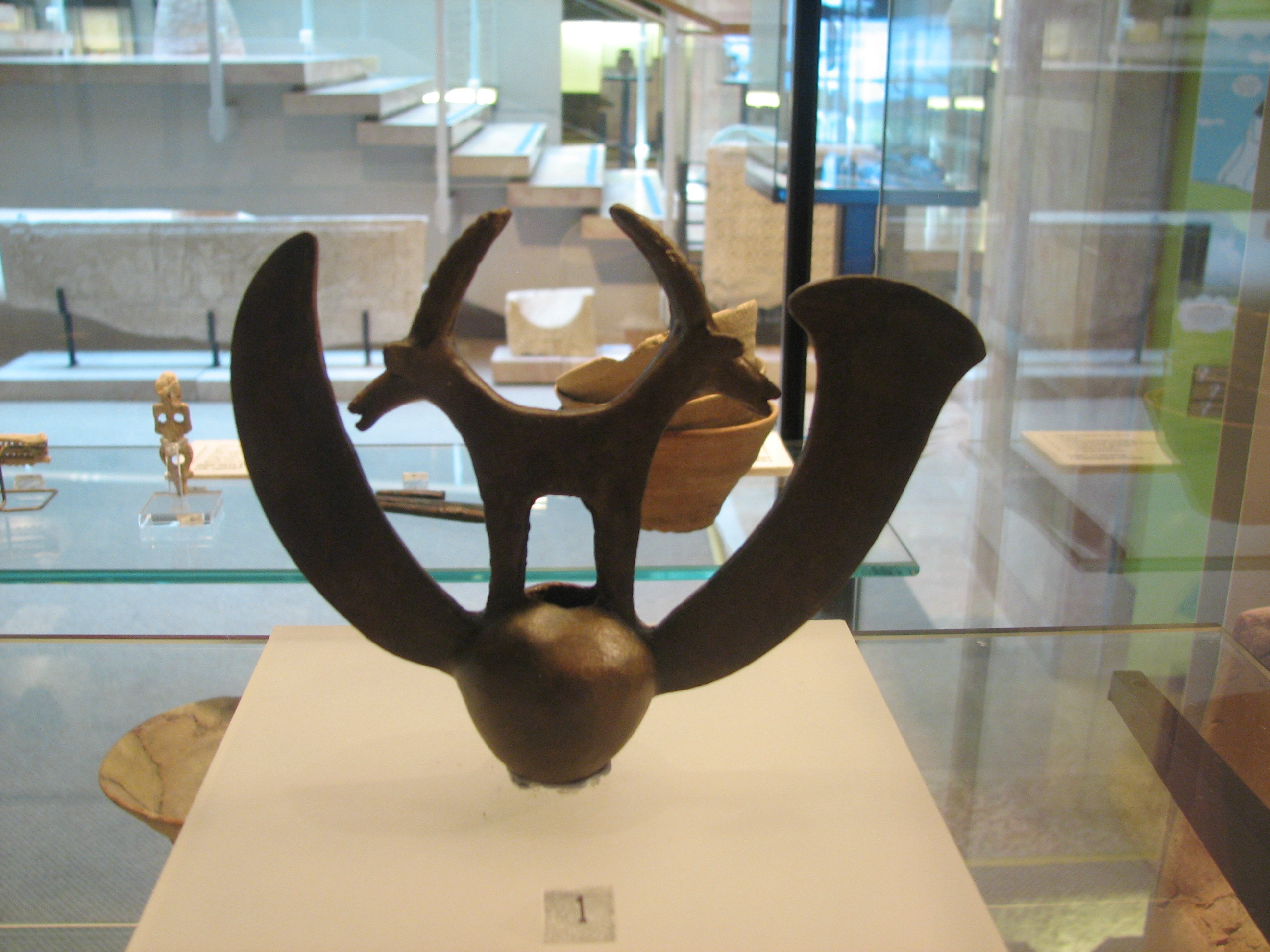
A crown from the hoard (replica), Hecht Museum, Haifa

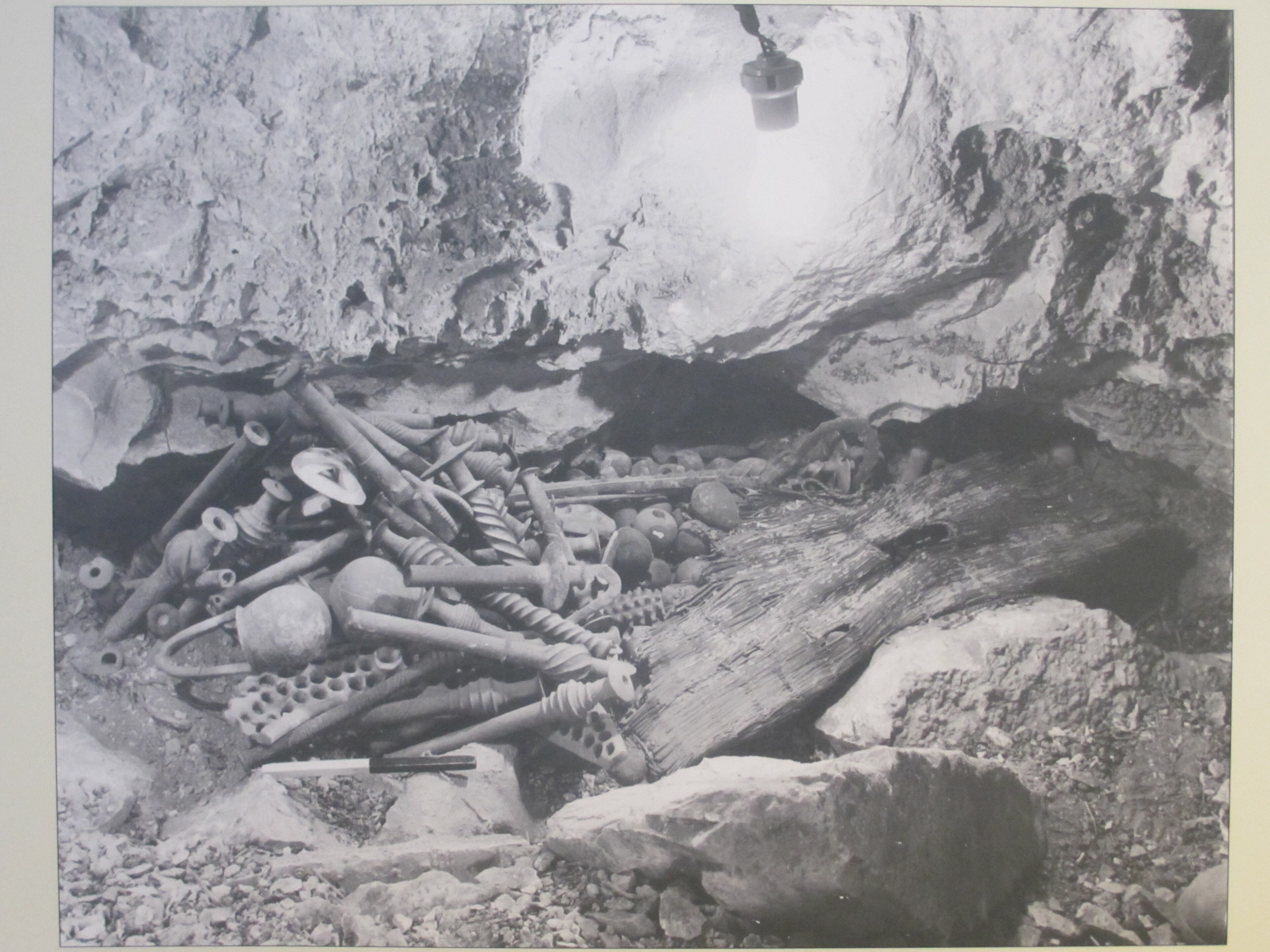
A photo of the discovery

The Nahal Mishmar hoard (also called the "Cave of the Treasure hoard") is the hoard of archaeological artifacts found by a 1961 expedition led by Pessah Bar-Adon in a cave by Nahal Mishmar in the Judaean Desert near the Dead Sea, Israel. The collection wrapped in a straw mat found under debris in a natural crevice contained 442 objects: 429 of copper, six of hematite, one of stone, five of hippopotamus ivory, and one of elephant ivory. Carbon-14 dating of the mat suggests the date at least 3,500 BCE, i.e., it places the hoard into the Chalcolithic period.

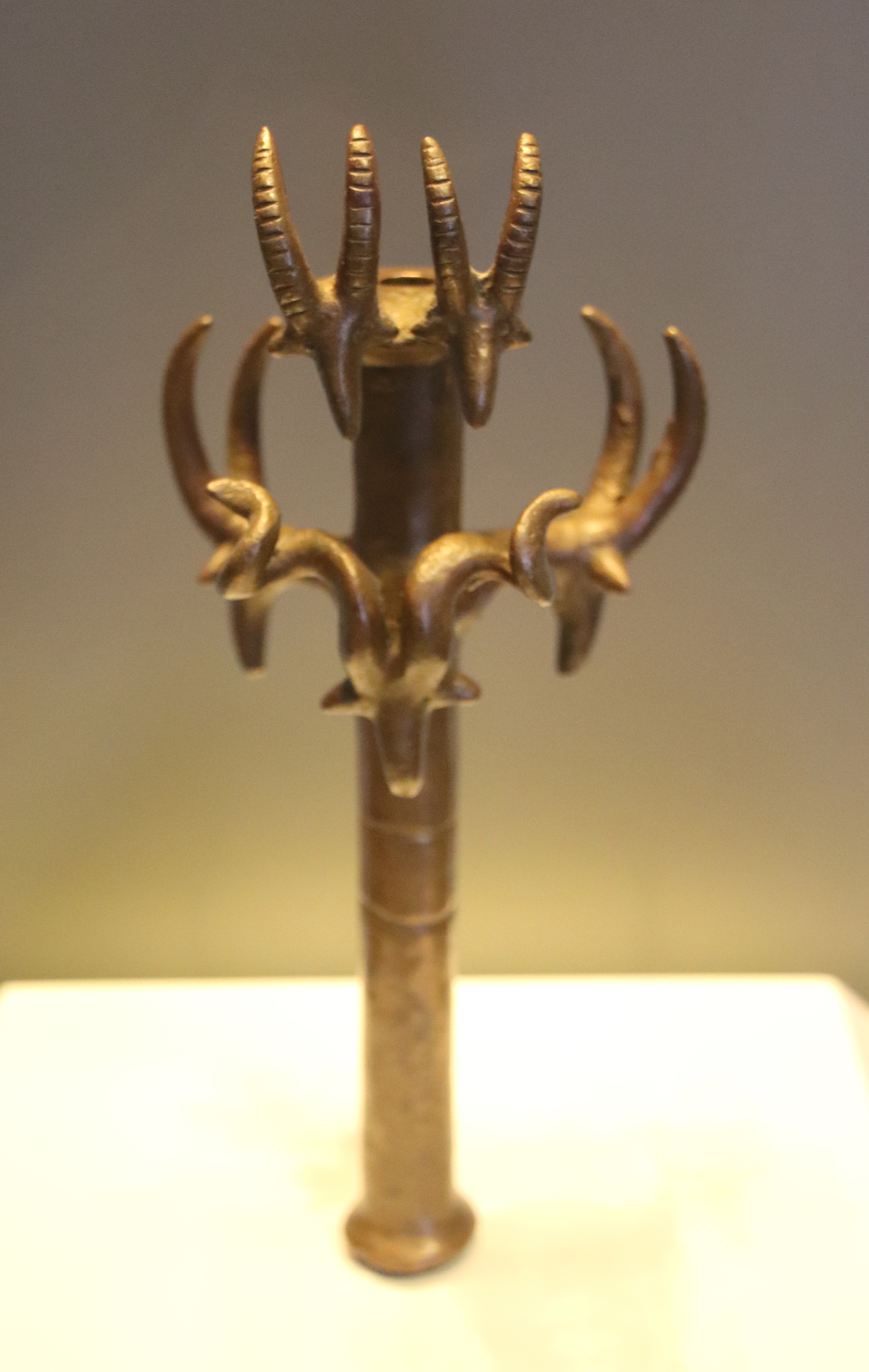
The goat wand

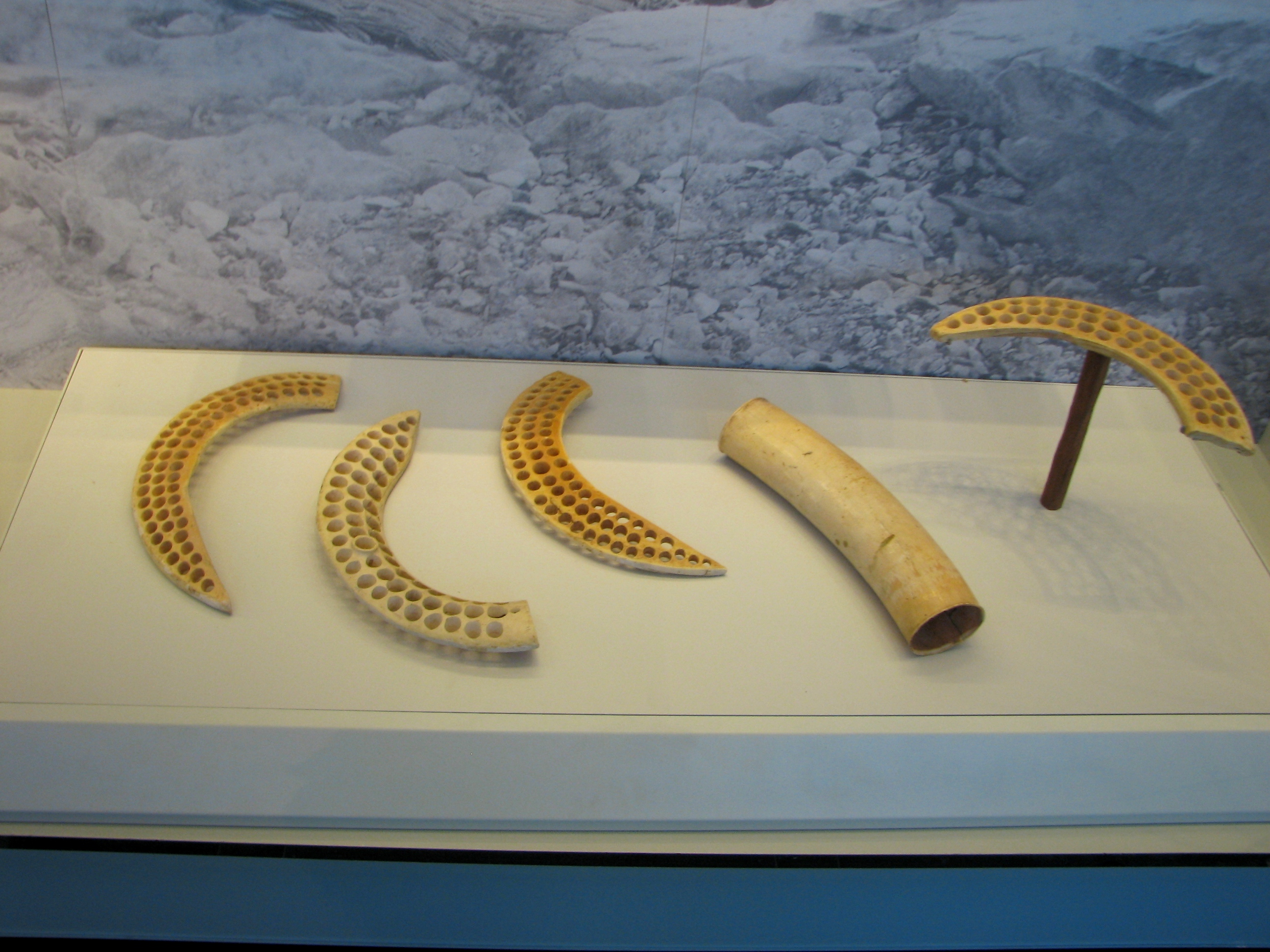
Objects made from hippopotamus tusks, cut lengthwise in the shape of a scythe and pierced with three rows of round holes, in the center of which is a hole surrounded by a raised rim.

== Origin of the hoard ==
The objects of the hoard seem to have been collected in a hurry. There are several theories about the origin of the hoard. Archaeologist David Ussishkin has suggested the hoard may have been the cultic furniture of the abandoned Chalcolithic Temple of Ein Gedi about 7 miles (11 km) south from the site. Yosef Garfinkel stated that no proof have been provided for the connection of the hoard with the temple and suggested that this was a burial of cult objects, to prevent their desecration, drawing a parallel with the find in the Nahal Hemar Cave Miriam Tadmor suggests that it was a kind of merchants' warehouse, judging from the amount of mundane objects, as well as tools and raw materials. It was also suggested that a possible alternate source of the hoard could have been another cultic location, at the place of some fragmentary ruins near the cave.
