= Pessah Bar-Adon =

Israeli archaeologist and writer

- פסח בר-אדון
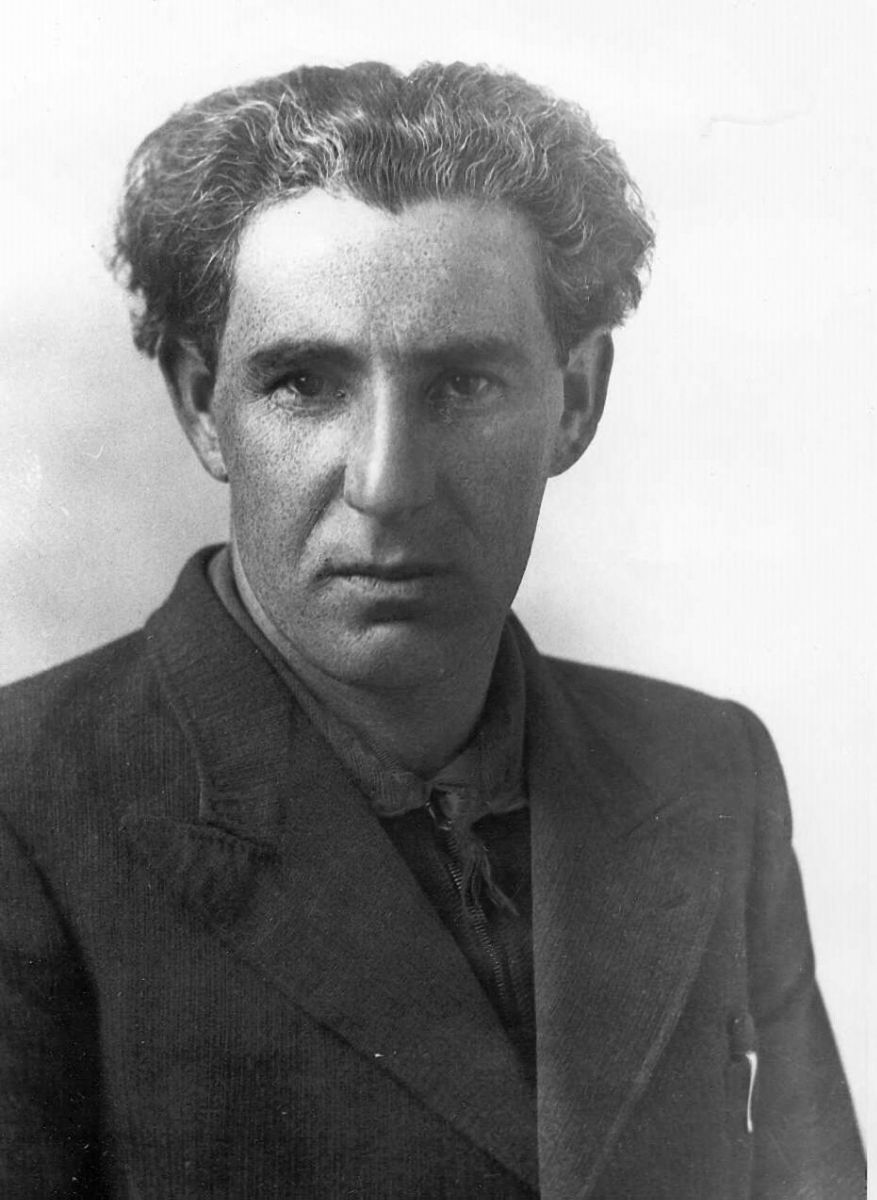
- Born: 1907; Kolno, Poland
- Died: 1985 (aged 77–78)
- Occupations: Archaeologist, writer
- Known for: Archaeological excavations
- Spouse: Dorothy Bar-Adon

Pessah Bar-Adon (Hebrew: פסח בר-אדון; b. 1907, d. 1985) was a Polish-born Israeli archaeologist and writer.

== Early life ==
Born Pessah Panitsch in Kolno, Poland, to a Zionist, Haredi family, he was educated in a Jewish orthodox school and in yeshivas. He immigrated to Israel in 1925. While working in housing and road construction to support himself, he studied for a degree in Middle Eastern studies at the Hebrew University of Jerusalem.

== Career ==
For a period, he lived amongst Bedouins near Amman, Bet She'an, and Kuneitra in order to learn their lifestyle. Part of his motivation for this endeavor was to understand why many of the ancient Kings of Israel were originally shepherds. During this period he wore traditional Bedouin clothing and went by the name Aziz Effendi.

During the 1929 Palestine riots and the 1936–1939 Arab revolt in Palestine, he was an active member of the Haganah Jerusalem. Later he also took part in the Aliyah Bet.

In 1932 he participated in one of the first movies made about the Jewish Yishuv in the British Mandate of Palestine, called "Sabra", directed by Aleksander Ford.

In 1939, he married Dorothy Kahn, an American journalist who fell in love with the Land of Israel, and the two moved to the Blumenfeld house in Moshav Merhavia. She died in 1950 at age 43.

Bar-Adon was involved in many archaeological excavations, among them: Bet Shearim, Tel Bet Yerah, and the discovery of the Nahal Mishmar hoard. He engaged in archaeology until the age of 70.
