= Qışlaq =

Qışlaq or Gyshlag or Gishlag or Gishlagh or Ghshlagh may refer to:

- Zhdanov, Lori, Armenia
- Qışlaq Abbas, Azerbaijan
- Qışlaq, Jabrayil, Azerbaijan
- Qişlaq, Khojaly, Azerbaijan
- Qışlaq, Lachin, Azerbaijan
- Qışlaq, Lerik (disambiguation), several places in Azerbaijan

- Qışlaq, Aşağı Amburdərə, Azerbaijan
- Qışlaq, Vıjaker, Azerbaijan
- Qışlaq, Zərigümaco, Azerbaijan

- Aşağı Qışlaq, Azerbaijan
- Ruçuq, Azerbaijan
- Şıxakəran, Azerbaijan
- Utalgi, Azerbaijan
- Yuxarı Qışlaq, Azerbaijan
- Xırt, Azerbaijan

== See also ==
- Qeshlaq (disambiguation)
- Kışla
