= Amburdərə =

Amburdərə or Amburdere may refer to:

- Aşağı Amburdərə, Lerik, Azerbaijan
- Yuxarı Amburdərə, Lerik, Azerbaijan
