= Shikhakeran =

Shikhakeran may refer to:

- Şıxakəran, Azerbaijan
- Şiyəkəran, Azerbaijan
