= Qışlaq, Lerik =

Qışlaq, Lerik may refer to:

- Qışlaq, Aşağı Amburdərə
- Qışlaq, Vıjaker
- Qışlaq, Zərigümaco
