= Khirt =

Khirt may refer to:

- Khirt, Azerbaijan
- Khirt, Iran
