= Paul Goldberg =

Paul Goldberg may refer to:

- Paul Goldberg (geologist), American geologist
- Paul Goldberg (writer) (born 1959), American novelist and journalist

== See also ==
- Pål Golberg (born 1990), Norwegian cross country skier
- Paul Goldberger (born 1950), American architectural critic and educator
