= Bir Abu Matar =

Archaeological site in Israel

Coordinates: 31°14′01.5″N 34°46′31″E

Entrance to the largest underground house excavated in Bir Abu Matar

Bir Abu Matar is an archaeological site in the Valley of Beersheba that contains remains dated to the Chalcolithic period. It is located on the northern bank of the Beersheba Creek, on the southern outskirts of Beersheba in the Negev desert of southern Israel, at a location where water could probably have been obtained by digging wells. The culture discovered on this site and on a number of other sites in the Valley of Beersheba was named the Beersheba Culture. The settlements existed between c-4200 and c-4000 BC. The earth in this area is soft loess. One of the characteristics of the site, during the early phase of its settlement, was the construction of underground dwellings, dug in the earth. The site was first discovered and surveyed by David Alon, an Israeli archaeologist, in 1951. It was excavated by the French archaeologist, Jean Perrot, between 1951 and 1960. Rescue excavations were carried out in Bir Abu Matar in the 1980s and in the early 1990s. A small park was later built on top of the site, which is now situated at the southernmost edge of Na'veh Ze'ev borough, in Beersheba.

The Beersheba Culture is thought to be a phase, or a subculture, of the Ghassulian Culture, though other Ghassulian sites in the Negev had been settled a couple of centuries before the Beersheba Culture appeared.

== Settlement phases ==
The settlements discovered in Bir Abu Matar belong to the Chalcolithic period, Beersheba Culture, and can be divided into 3 distinct settlement phases, each with its own particular architecture: the earliest settlers built underground dwellings, dug in the soft loess. Later, when some of these homes collapsed - their ceilings had caved in - new, semi-underground houses were built on top of the old ones. In the 3rd and final phase the settlers built their homes completely above ground.

During all phases, houses usually contained one large central room connected to up to 10 other rooms located around it. The population had never exceeded 200 people.

Bir Abu Matar was part of a system of settlements that had economical connections with each other. In addition to subsistence farming, each settlement tended to specialize in one particular branch of industry: in Bir Tzafad it was ivory carving and in Bir Abu Matar - copper smelting and the production of copper instruments, artifacts and jewelry.

=== Subterranean phase ===
Initially, the houses were made of one large rectangular room accessible by a horizontal entry tunnel. The ceilings of those houses soon collapsed, and the locals began building houses of a different type: those usually contained several round or oval rooms, the size of which was about 3.5 x 4.0 meters. These houses were dug relatively deep under the surface, leaving a thick layer of soil between their ceiling and the ground above. All the rooms were connected by tunnels, at least one of which led to a vertical entry shaft, leading to the surface. These shafts sometimes had staircases built in them or carved out of the wall. Around the top of such entry shafts the residents usually dug a shallow depression that served as a yard.

An underground room in Bir Abu Matar with storage pits in its floor

Most of the rooms contained storage spaces dug in their floors which the residents kept covered with large stone slabs. Charred grains of food crops were discovered in some of them. Many rooms also contained pits of different sizes, some of which had been sealed with plaster, which indicates that they had been used for storing water. Most of the floors of these rooms were found covered in ash, pottery sherds, animal bones, etc., indicating these houses were used as a living space. Houses of this type are best suited for a climate where the days are hot and the nights are cold, since the temperature in them remains even throughout the day.

These houses had ventilation shafts which mostly drew air from the western side of the settlement. Many small ceramic bowls were discovered during excavations - those were probably used as primitive lamps, since these subterranean houses had been immersed in permanent darkness and needed to be artificially illuminated.

Most of these underground houses had been abandoned by their owners. Houses with sealed storage spaces containing neatly arranged house appliances were discovered on the site. Their rooms had been sealed with large stone slabs. Many of these houses had never been re-occupied; they were found whole and still "locked up", during excavations.

=== Semi-subterranean phase ===
After the residents of the subterranean houses had abandoned them the site was re-settled, most likely by the same people. They built semi-subterranean houses in the pits left over after the collapse of the subterranean houses from the previous phase. These houses were round or oval in shape and had walls made of unburned mud bricks. On top of these walls four depressions were made, one in each corner. These depressions held wooden beams that supported a roof made of branches covered in clay.

=== Above-ground phase ===
In the third phase of settlement, which consisted of two construction phases, houses were built above ground, on stone foundations that were laid on top of the houses from the previous occupational phases (subterranean and semi-subterranean). Of the houses belonging to this phase only the stone foundations have survived. The rooms were rectangular, with average dimensions of approximately 3 x 7 meters, with some reaching the length of 15 meters. Perrot estimated there was a connection between this phase and Level IV in Teleilat el Ghassul (which is one of the Ghassulian phases of that site; for more details, please read Teleilat el Ghassul#Excavations) .

== Subsistence ==
=== Animal husbandry ===
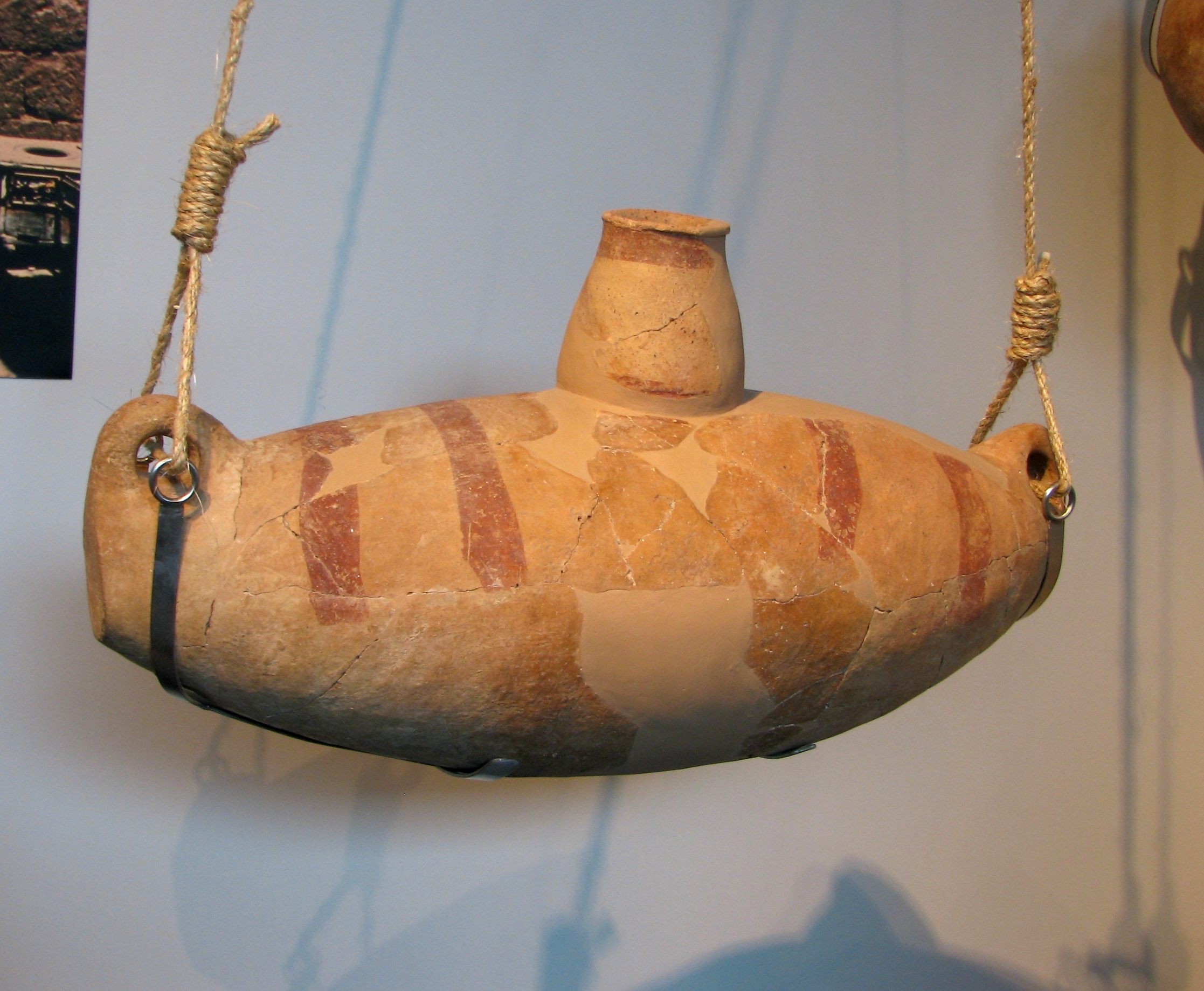
A large Chalcolithic butter churn, Israel Museum.

Animal husbandry was the main sources of subsistence for the residents of Bir Abu Matar. They bred sheep, goats, cattle and pigs. An examination of the animal bones discovered on the site reveals that the average age of death of the local farm animals had been high. This indicates that secondary use of these animals - for instance, for dairy production - had been considerable. The pottery assemblages also point to the importance of dairy in the lives of the locals: it includes butter churns shaped like waterskins and horn shaped goblets. Butter churns of this type are not present in assemblages postdating the Chalcolithic era.

=== Agriculture ===
Grains of wheat and barley, and also of lentils, were discovered on the site. Grinding stones for grain have also been found. The presence of so many pits and storage spaces dug into the floors of the rooms of the houses indicate that the locals produced an excess of food, beyond their immediate, everyday, needs. This is why they required a lot of storage space, and they also needed to protect it from rodents and from other pests, which is why those storage spaces were sealed with large slabs of stone.

== Industry ==
=== Copper industry ===
Signs of an extensive copper industry have been found in Bir Abu Matar, including remains of copper and of Malachite. There are no copper deposits in the area, therefore it seems the ore was brought here from Wadi Feynan, in the southern Jordan Rift Valley, or, possibly, even from Timna, where an ancient mine was discovered, attributed by Beno Rothenberg to the Chalcolithic era. Many remains of copper ore, including several slag cores, have been found in Bir Abu Matar. Several kilograms of copper ore were discovered near a pair of flat flint stones that were probably used for grinding it. The ground material then received initial processing in regular ovens, and was later smelted in special furnaces. These furnaces were round, less than one meter in diameter, with evident signs of smelting still seen on their inside when they were discovered. They were made of earth reinforced with straw. At the end of the smelting process the copper was distilled in small bowls, prepared especially for this purpose. It seems the molten copper was then poured into earthen molds which were shattered after the metal had cooled off.

No other metalworking instruments, nor instruments that could have been used for increasing the air flow inside the furnaces, were discovered in Bir Abu Matar. Several copper artifacts were found at the site, which had been probably manufactured locally, including several round club heads and various types of copper jewellery. Other copper tools - axes, plows and other instruments - were found on the site.

=== Basalt artifacts ===
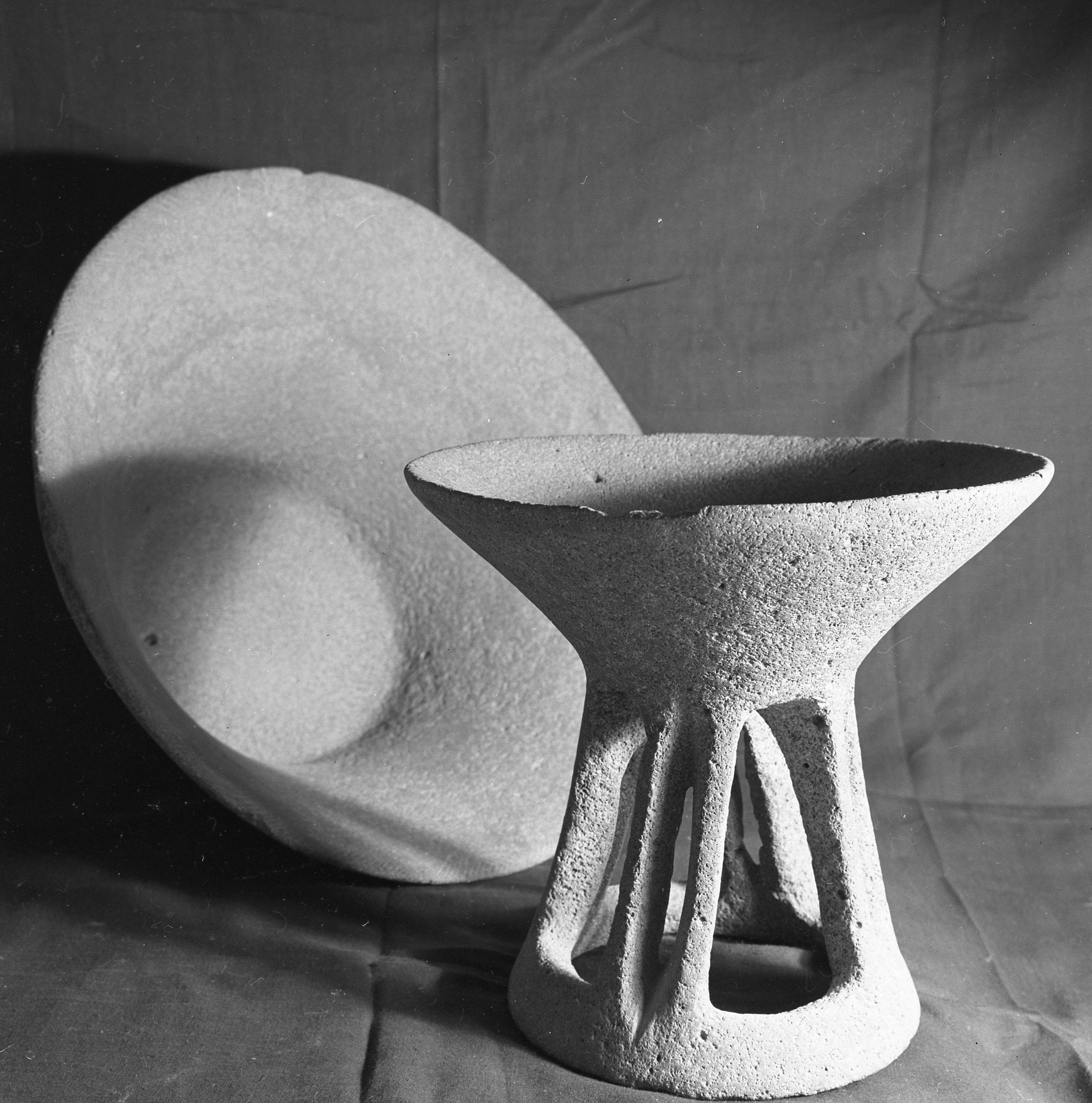
Basalt tools found in the site

The finest basalt artifacts of the Chalcolithic era were found on the sites of the Beersheba Culture, one of which is Bir Abu Matar. As was mentioned before, many of the ancient residents of Bir Abu Matar had abandoned their homes, leaving their house appliances neatly sealed away in one of the house's storage spaces. In some of those homes, sets of three elegant basalt tools of impressive craftsmanship were discovered. Those consist of two large bowls, 30 - 50 cm in diameter, and a chalice - a bowl set on a high, fenestrated, base (creating the impression that the bowl is standing on several legs that are connected at the bottom).

It is very likely that these sets of unique vessels were used for ritualistic purposes. They were not manufactured on site, but rather imported, probably from the northern parts of contemporary Israel or from southern Syria, from the region of the Golan Heights or from the Hauran, where this stone is plentiful. The presence of similar sets of tools made from clay in other houses indicates that these basalt vessels may have also served as symbols of status, indicating an early phase of social stratification in Late Chalcolithic Levantine societies.

=== Stone tools ===
Many different flint tools were discovered in Bir Abu Matar, mostly scrapers, tools for cutting and drills. Limestone tools and tools made of other types of hard stone were also manufactured locally - hoes, club heads, small discs, platters, figurines, pendants.

=== Bone tools ===
Few bone tools were made or used in Bir Abu Matar - mostly picks, needles, combs and sickles.

== Trade ==
The large variety of objects and artifacts used by the local population indicate that they had trading relationships with neighboring and with far away settlements. This is also consistent with the tendency of the various sites of the Berrsheba Culture to specialize in different types of industry. Basalt tools were imported from the north, probably from the Hauran. A large basalt bowl had been discovered in the Sea of Galilee, Copper ore from the southwest, from, Wadi Feynan or from Timna and malachite from Wadi Feynan. Marine shells that were used for decoration point to the existence of trading relations with the Red Sea coastline and with the Mediterranean coastline. Huge shells were also found that could only have been imported from the Nile Valley; also ivory statuettes that include motives found in artifacts from pre-dynastic Upper Egypt (Amratian and Gerzean cultures).

The statuettes are in the shapes of bearded men, naked women, birds, miniature sickles and other objects, and were probably used for ritualistic purposes. They have holes at the top, indicating they were intended to be hanged by a cord.

== Abandonment ==
There are several phases of settlement followed by abandonment in Bir Abu Matar. The residents tended to neatly arrange their belongings in one of the storage spaces dug in the floor of their house, then seal that storage space and all rooms of the house with stone slabs before leaving. These evidence point to the abandonment of the site being a planned action. Several hypotheses were proposed to explain these abandonment events:

- The site was of a seasonal nature - the residents' main occupation was tending to their animal herds, which forced them to migrate and regularly abandon their permanent settlement.
- Climate changes forced the abandonment.
- The final abandonment of the site could have been caused by the deterioration of security conditions in the region at the end of the 5th millennium BC. During that period, other sites, situated in more defensible parts of Israel, were settled.

No evidence found on site indicate that the cause for the abandonment had been violence, an attack on the settlement.

== See also ==
- Chalcolithic Temple of Ein Gedi
- Teleilat el Ghassul

== Sources ==
- Isaac Gilead, A New Look at Chalcolithic Beer-Sheba, The Biblical Archaeologist, Vol 50, No. 2. (June, 1987), pp 110–117
- Jean Perrot, The excavation at Tell Abu-Matar near Beer-Sheba (1953-1954), Journal of the Israel Exploration Society, issue 18 (1953), pp 121–128
- Steven Rozen, Itzhak Gil'ad, Peter Fabian, The Matar Ruins (Bir Matar), 1990-1991, Archaeology News, 99 (1993), pp 88–89
- Itzhak Gil'ad, Peter Fabian, Beersheba - A Budding Metropolis (edited by Yehuda Gross and Ester Meir-Galitzinstein), Ben-Gurion University of the Negev Publishing, 2008.
- Jean Perrot, Beersheba, The New Encyclopedia of Archaeological Excavations in the Holy Land, Israel Exploration Society, 1992.
- David Ussishkin, The Chalcolithic Period in Israel, Quadmoniot, Year 3, Books 3 & 12, 1970.
- Amnon Ben-Tor, The Chalcolithic Period, The Archaeology Of Ancient Israel In The Biblical Period, Unit 3, pp 119–180, ISBN 965-302-483-3.
