= Butter churn =

Food processing device

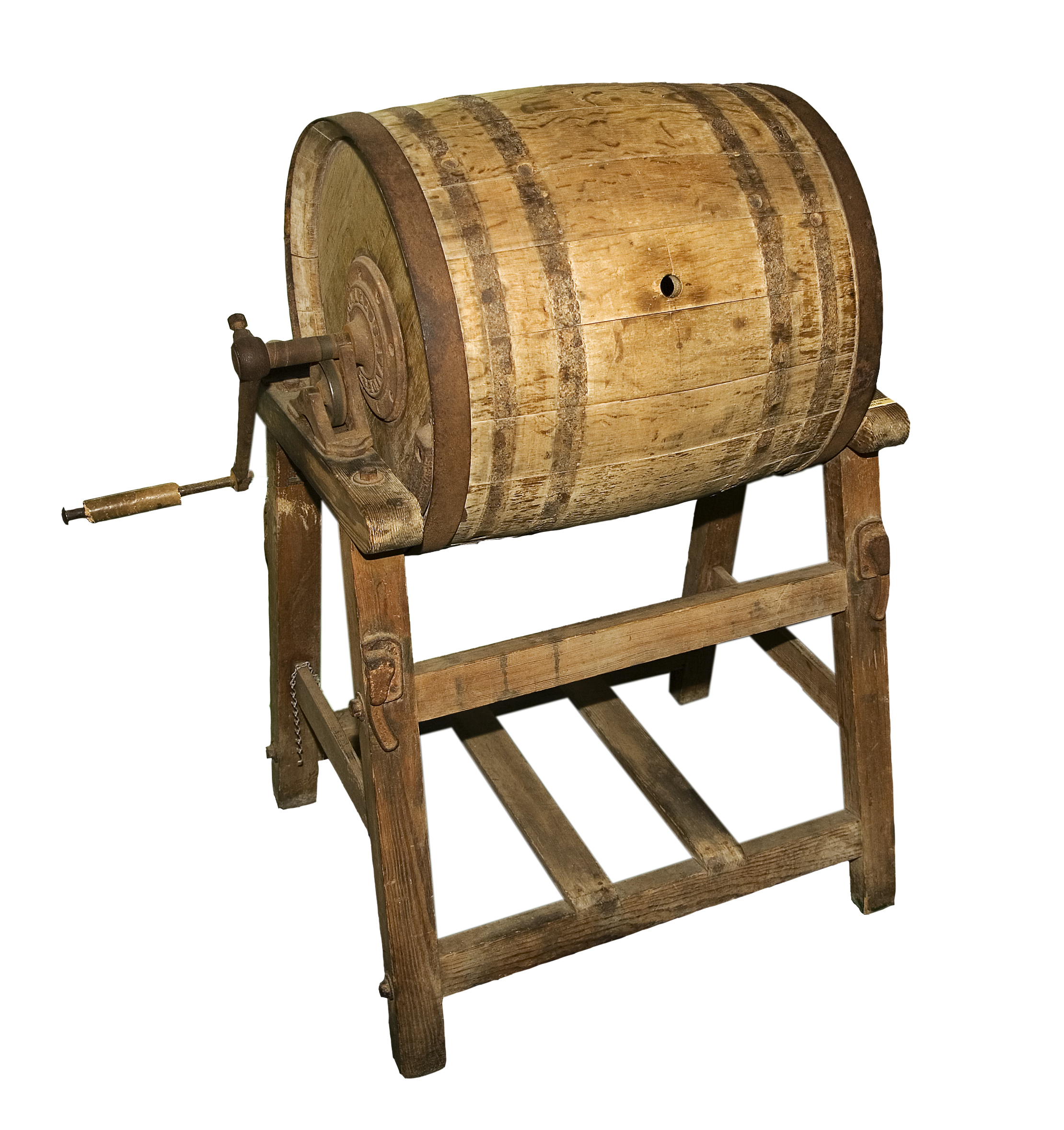
A barrel-type butter churn

A typical plunger-type butter churn used by American pioneers

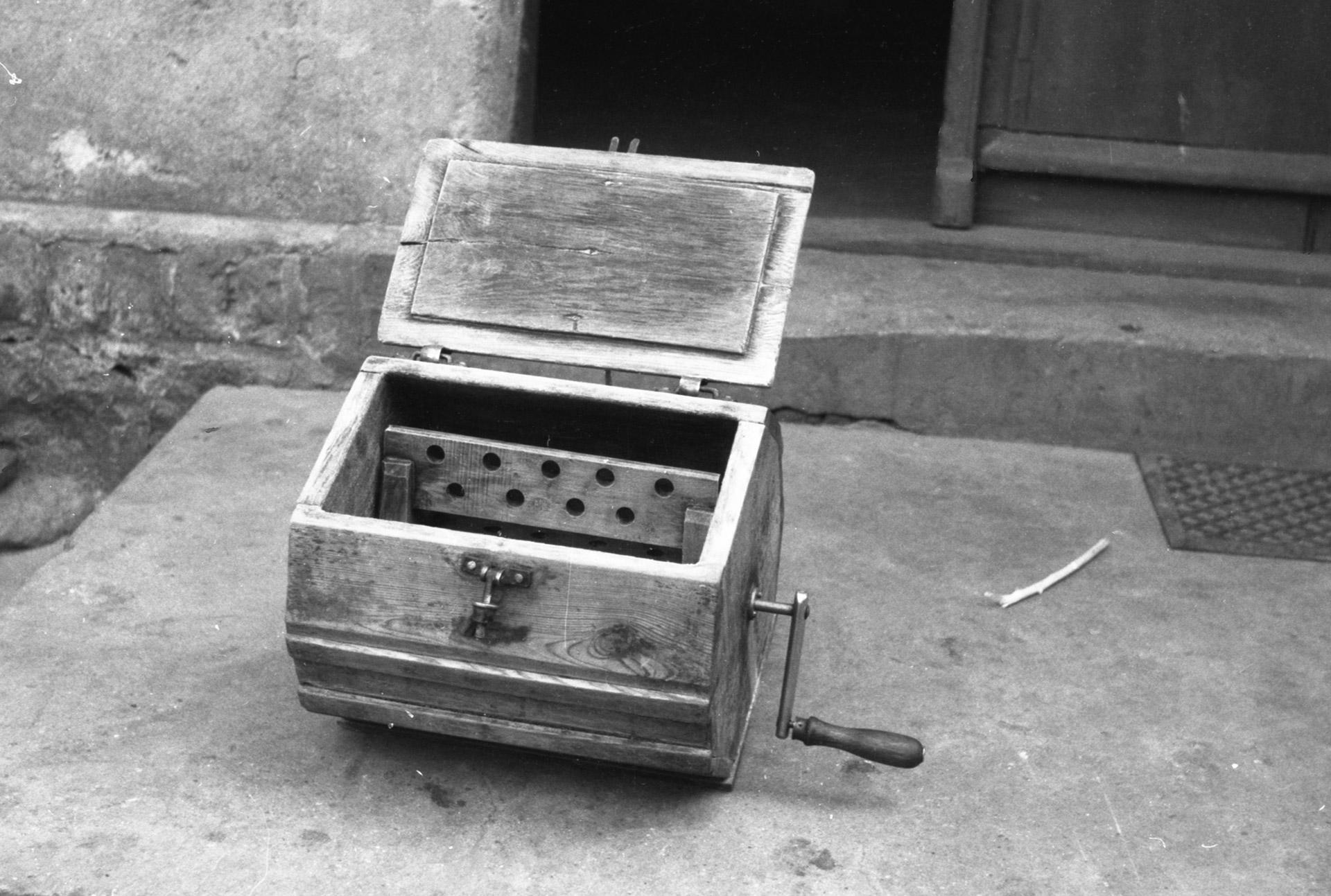
A paddle butter churn

A butter churn is a device used to convert cream into butter, a process known as churning. This is done through a mechanical process, frequently via a pole inserted through the lid of the churn, or via a crank used to turn a rotating device inside the churn.

== Etymology ==
The word butter is believed by some to derive from the Greek word bou-tyron, the approximate meaning of which is 'cow cheese'. Others believe it came from the Scythian culture, as the ancient Greeks tended to herd sheep and goats, whose milk is not as good for butter making as cow milk, which the Scythians primarily herded.

The word churn is from the Old English ċyrin 'to churn'. This is probably derived from the Old English cyrnel 'kernel', due to the appearance of butter grains after milk has been churned.

The butter churn gave its name and rough form to the milk churn, which is used to transport milk, not churn it.

== History ==
The use of butter is mentioned in biblical works and the earliest butter churn vessels belonging to Beersheba culture in Israel were found in Bir Abu Matar going back to Chalcolithic period between 6500–5500 BC.

The butter churn in Europe may have existed as early as the 6th century AD, as can be seen by what appears to be a churn lid found in Scotland dating from that era. In the European tradition, the butter churn was primarily a device used by women, and the churning of butter was an essential responsibility along with other household chores. In earlier traditions of butter making, nomadic cultures placed milk in skin bags and produced butter either by shaking the bag manually, or possibly by attaching the bag to a pack animal, and producing butter simply through the movement of the animal. Some theorists believe this is how the butter creation process was discovered. Some cultures still use a process similar to this, whereby a bag is filled with milk, tied to a stick, and vigorously shaken.

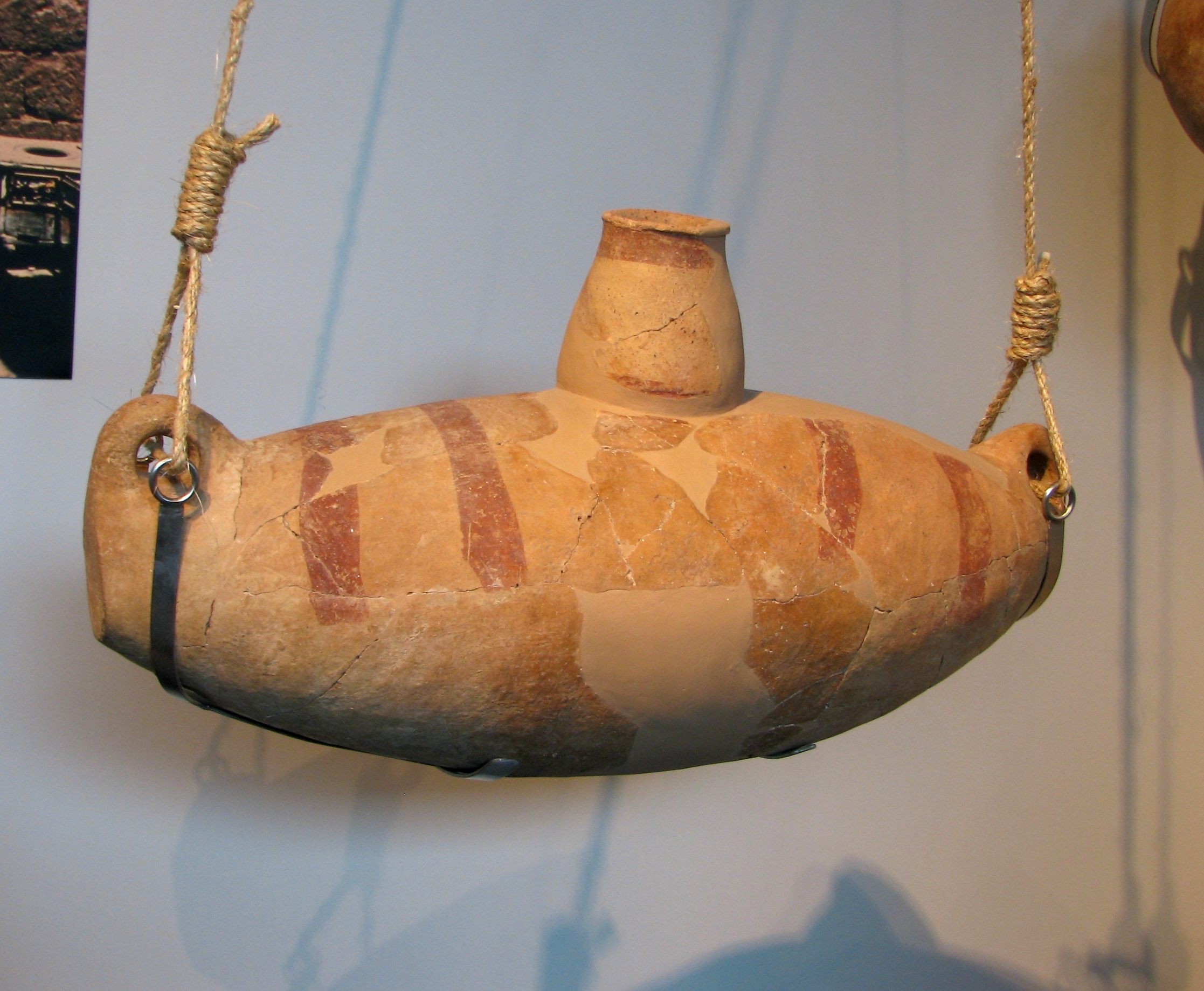
A large Chalcolithic butter churn, Israel Museum

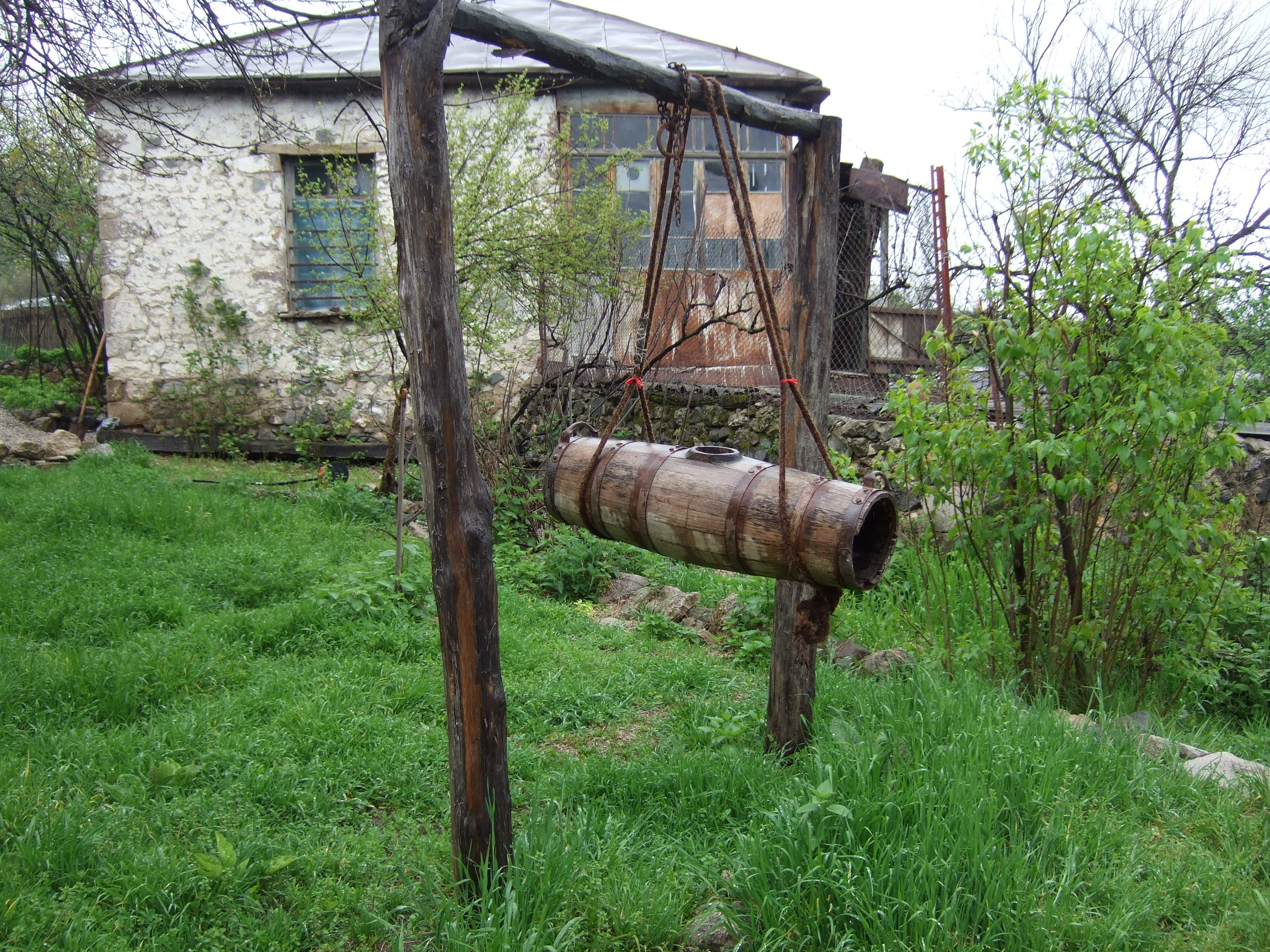
An old horizontal butter churn in Tsaghkashat, Nagorno-Karabakh

== Butter churn types ==
=== Plunge churn ===
The most historically prominent types of butter churns are the plunge churn, which is a container, usually made out of wood, where the butter-making action is created by moving in a vertical motion a staff that is inserted into the top. This type of churn is also known as an 'up and down' churn, churning tub, plunger churn, plumping churn, knocker churn, plump-kirn, or plowt-kirn (where "kirn" is a Scots/Northern English word for churn). The staff used in the churn is known as the dash, dasher-staff, churn-staff, churning-stick, plunger, plumper, or kirn-staff.

=== Paddle churn ===
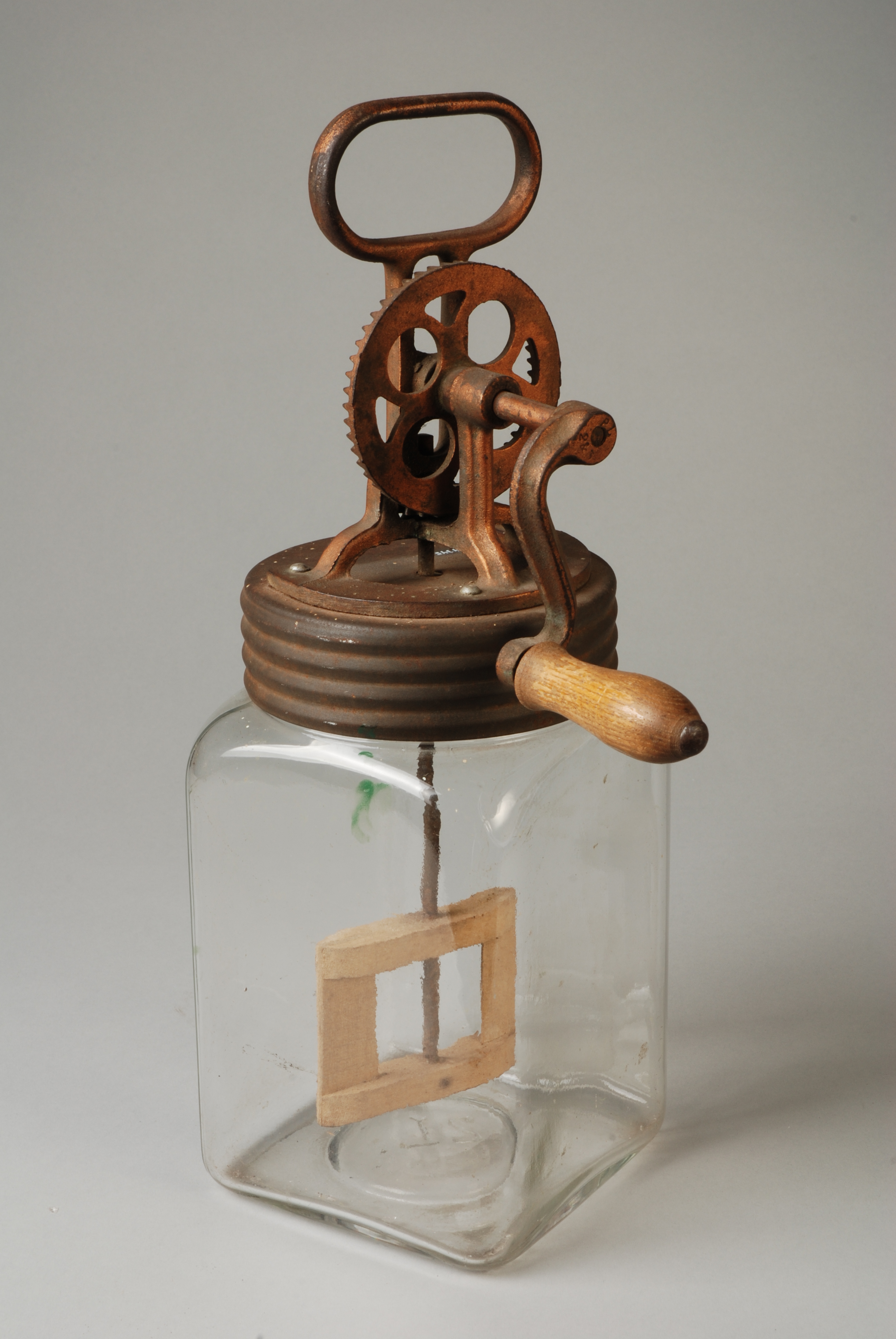
Paddle type hand-cranked butter churn

Another prominent type of churn was the paddle churn, which was a container that contained a paddle, which was operated by a handle. The paddle churned the butter inside the container when the handle was turned.

=== Barrel churn (with crank) ===
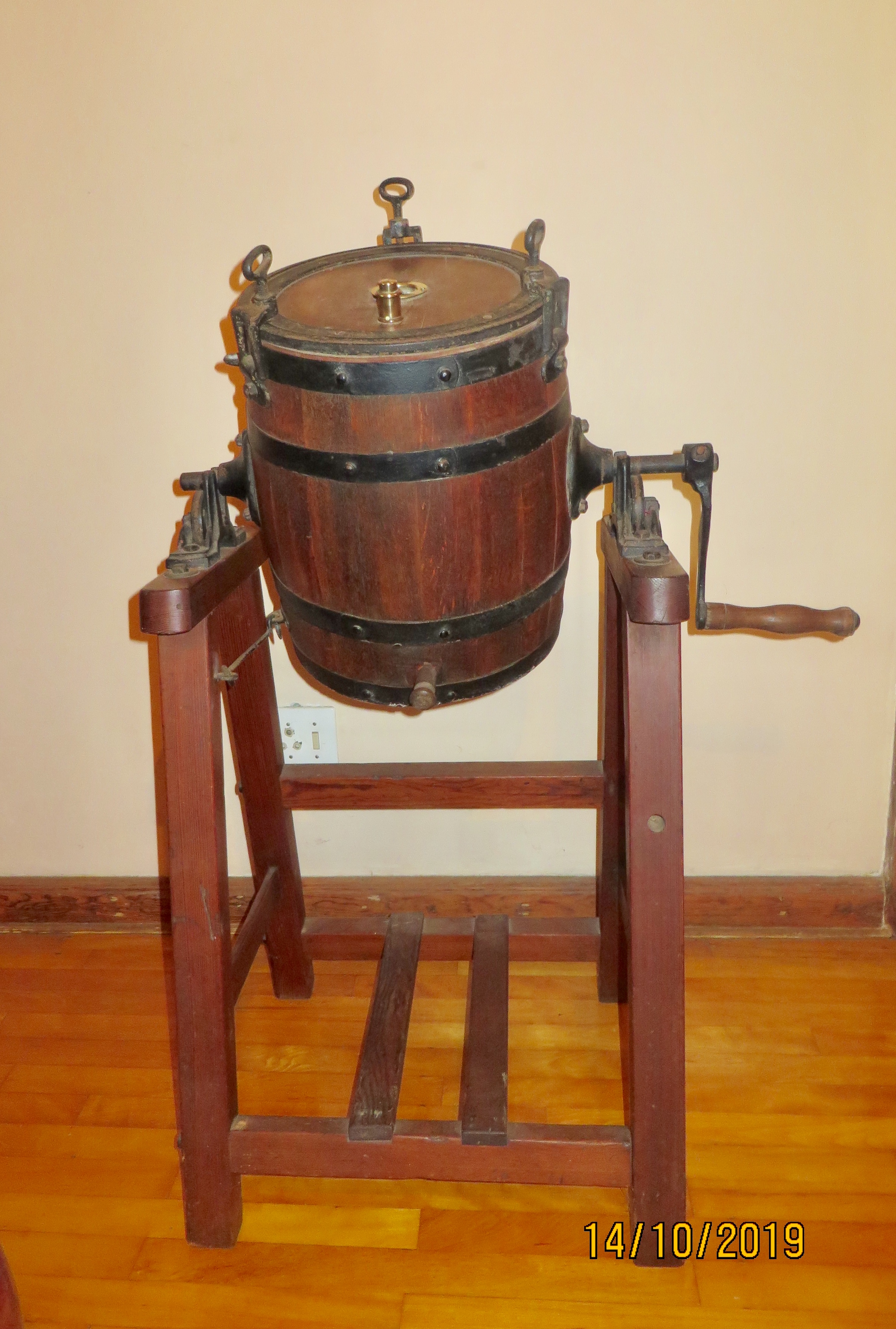
Churn for making butter with vertical rotation

The barrel churn was also used extensively. This type of churn was a barrel turned onto its side with a crank attached. The crank either turned a paddle device inside the churn, as in the paddle churn, or turned the whole barrel either horizontally or vertically, depending on its construction. Agitation of the cream in this manner converted the milk to butter. The barrel churn was one of the agricultural innovations of 18th century Europe.

=== Rocking chair churn ===
One particularly novel invention of note was the rocking chair butter churn. This device, invented by Alfred Clark, consisted of a barrel attached to a rocking chair. While the rocking chair moved, the barrel moved and churned the milk within into butter.

== See also ==
- Butter-churn tower, named after its similarity to a type of butter churn.
