= Beersheba culture =

The Beersheba culture is a Late Chalcolithic archaeological culture of the late 5th millennium BC (c. 4200–4000 BC), that was discovered in several sites near Beersheba, in the Beershebal Valley, in the northern Negev, in the 1950s. It is considered to be a phase of the Ghassulian culture. Its main sites are Bir Abu Matar, Bir Tzafad and Bir Safadi, but additional sites belonging to this cultural phase have been discovered in other parts of southern Israel.

== History ==
In the first phase of settlement, the people of the Beersheba culture lived in underground dwellings, dug in the soft loess of the Beersheba Valley. Several of these settlements were constructed in the banks of the Beersheba Creek, in areas where water could be obtained by digging wells. In the second phase, semi-subterranean houses were built on top of underground houses that had collapsed and, in the third and last phase, houses were built completely above ground on stone foundations. The walls of the houses in the later two phases were built from pisé and the roofs consisted of branches covered in clay which lay on top of two large crossed support beams.

The different settlements of this culture were part of an economical system - they traded with one another and with other, more distant, populations. In addition to subsistence farming, each settlement tended to specialize in one particular branch of industry: in Bir Tzafad it was ivory carving and in Bir Abu Matar - copper smelting and the production of copper instruments, artifacts and jewelry.

== Subsistence ==
The main source of subsistence for the people of the Beersheba culture was animal husbandry. They raised sheep, goats, cattle and pigs. The relatively old age of the animal bones found on Beersheba sites, indicates that the secondary use of these animals - for instance, for dairy production - had been considerable. The pottery assemblages also point to the importance of dairy in the lives of the locals: it includes butter churns shaped like waterskins and horn shaped goblets.

Grains of wheat, barley, and lentils, were discovered in houses on the different sites, and also grinding stones that had been used for grain. The multitude of storage spaces dug into the floors of the houses indicates the people of the Beersheba culture produced an excess of food for which they needed storage space that was dry and well protected against rodents and other pests.

== Industry ==
The different settlements of the Beersheba culture tended to specialize in particular types of craft. Bir Abu Matar, for instance, specialized in smelting and casting copper. Copper ore, imported from Wadi Feynan or, possibly, from Timna, was ground, 'cooked' in regular ovens and then smelted in small furnaces and distilled in special clay bowls. It was then cast into molds made of compressed earth, which were shattered after the metal had cooled off. Thus copper instruments - club heads, axes, plows, tools for ivory carving etc. - ritual artifacts and jewelry had been produced.

Other settlements, such as Bir Tzafad, specialized in ivory carving. The ivory was probably brought here from Africa.

People of this culture also produced a multitude of stone (flint) tools, chief among which were fan scrapers, used mainly for working leather. The source material for these tools was usually local, but sometimes imported. Bone tools - such as picks, needles, combs and sickles - were also in use.

== Trade ==
Many trading routes go through the Negev - those connecting Northern Arabia with the Mediterranean coastline and the ones connecting Egypt with the Levant. Many of these routes pass near Beersheba, and it seems that people of the Beersheba culture had taken an active part in it.

The locals had to import many of the raw materials used in their industries - the ivory was brought from Africa and the copper from Wady Feynan and from Timna, in the south-eastern Levant (the south of Israel and Jordan). Additionally basalt artifacts (sets of large, finely crafted, basalt bowls) that were probably used in religious rituals were imported from the north, from the Golan or from the Houran. Marine shells that were used for decoration point to the existence of trading relations with the Red Sea coastline and with the Mediterranean coastline. Huge shells were also found in the Beersheba sites, that could only have been imported from the Nile Valley.

Ivory statuettes of this culture include motifs found in artifacts from pre-dynastic Upper Egypt (Amratian and Gerzean cultures).

== Abandonment ==
It is not known for sure why the sites of the Beersheba culture had been abandoned by their settlers. It is evident the residents intended to return - many houses were found, during excavations, with all their rooms sealed with large stone slabs and all the family's house appliances sealed neatly in one of the storage spaces. It may have been due to climate changes or because of a deterioration of security conditions in the region at the end of the 5th millennium BC. It has also been suggested that the residents of these sites had been accustomed to changing their lifestyle as circumstances dictated - from nomadic to sedentary and vice versa - and that the abandonment incidents and the subsequent re-settling incidents had been a result of such lifestyle changes, probably in response to changing circumstances.

It is possible that the population of this culture mixed with new immigrants from the north to form the regional population of the Early Bronze Age in the region.

== See also ==
- Archaeology of Israel
- Chalcolithic temple of Ein Gedi
- Teleilat el Ghassul, type-site

== Sources ==
- Yitzhak Gilad, "A New Look at Chalcolithic Beer-Sheba", The Biblical Archaeologist, Vol 50, No. 2. (June, 1987), pp. 110–117.
- Jean Perrot, "The excavation at Tell Abu-Matar near Beer-Sheba (1953-1954)", Journal of the Israel Exploration Society, issue 18 (1953), pp. 121–128.
- Steven Rozen, Yitzhak Gilad, Peter Fabian, "The Matar Ruins (Bir Matar), 1990-1991", Archaeology News, 99 (1993), pp. 88–89.
- Yitzhak Gilad, Peter Fabian (2008), Beersheba - A Budding Metropolis, Yehuda Gross and Ester Meir-Galitzinstein (eds.), Ben-Gurion University of the Negev Publishing.
- Jean Perrot (1992), "Beersheba", The New Encyclopedia of Archaeological Excavations in the Holy Land, Israel Exploration Society.
- David Ussishkin (1970), "The Chalcolithic Period in Israel", Quadmoniot, Year 3, Books 3 & 12.
- Ben-Tor, Amnon, ed. (1989). "The Chalcolithic Period". מבוא לארכיאולוגיה של ארץ-ישראל בתקופת המקרא [Introduction to the Archaeology of the Land of Israel in Biblical Times] (in Hebrew). Vol. 4, Unit 3. Tel Aviv: Open University of Israel. pp. 119–180. ISBN 9653024833. Has appeared in English as The Archaeology of Ancient Israel, transl. Raphael Greenberg, Yale University Press, 1992, ISBN 0300059191.
