= Dalaqo =

Human settlement in Azerbaijan

Coordinates: 41°09′N 48°34′E

Dalaqo is a village in the municipality of Güləzi in the Quba Rayon of Azerbaijan.
