= Zərigümaco =

- Municipality
- Location within Azerbaijan
- Coordinates: 38°42′02″N 48°38′07″E
- Country: Azerbaijan
- Rayon: Lerik

Population
  - Total: 517
- Time zone: UTC+4 (AZT)
  - Summer (DST): UTC+5 (AZT)

Zərigümaco (also, Zəriküməco and Zärigümäco) is a village and municipality in the Lerik Rayon of Azerbaijan. It has a population of 517. The municipality consists of the villages of Zərigümaco and Qışlaq.
