= Hilədərə =

Village in Lerik District, Azerbaijan

Coordinates: 38.70599°N 48.29171°E

Hilədərə is a village in the municipality of Aşağı Amburdərə in the Lerik Rayon of Azerbaijan.
