= Kunxırt =

- Location within Azerbaijan
- Coordinates: 41°08′N 48°35′E
- Country: Azerbaijan
- District: Quba
- Municipality: Güləzi
- Time zone: UTC+4 (AZT)
  - Summer (DST): UTC+5 (AZT)

Kunxırt (also, Kunkhyrt and Kunkhirt; Tat: Kunxirt) is a village in the Quba District of Azerbaijan. The village forms part of the municipality of Güləzi.
