= Paul Goldberg (geologist) =

American geologist

Paul Goldberg is a geologist specializing in geomorphology and geoarchaeology who had done extensive worldwide field researches.

== Education ==
Paul Goldberg studied geology at the University of Colorado Boulder where he obtained his bachelor's degree in 1965. He continued his study of geology at the University of Michigan in 1968 where he graduated with a Masters in Science. He completed his Ph.D. in geology at University of Michigan in 1973. His Doctorate study focused on Sedimentology, Stratigraphy and Paleoclimatology from et-Tabun Cave, Mount Carmel, Israel. His Ph.D. advisor was Professor William R. Farrand, also a geologist.

== Academic experience ==
Goldberg began his academic teaching career in 1972 as a lecturer in Earth Science at Kingsborough Community College. From 1973-1975 Goldberg was a Lady Davis Postdoctoral Fellow at the Institute of Archaeology at Hebrew University in Jerusalem. From 1984-1992 he was an Associate Professor at the Institute of Archaeology, Hebrew University. Goldberg was a research fellow at the Texas Archaeological Research Laboratory at University of Texas at Austin working on the Wilson-Leonard site (1991-1995). In 1995 he moved to Boston University as an Associate Professor in the Archaeology Department and was promoted to Full Professor in 1997. His research then - and now - focuses on geoarchaeology, micromorphology, and how archaeological sites form. He retired from Boston University in 2014 . Goldberg was a former co-editor of the journal Geoarchaeology with Ofer Bar-Yosef, and later Rolfe D. Mandel. He is currently an Affiliated Professor of Geoarchaeology and Senior Researcher at the Institute for Archaeological Sciences, Department of Geosciences, University of Tübingen, Germany.

== Field researcher ==
Goldberg has undertaken fieldwork all over the world, including, France, Spain, Gibraltar, England, Germany, China, South Africa, Georgia Republic, Australia, and the US.

== Editorial and other activities ==
Goldberg was an Associate editor of several journals including, Geoarchaeology, Palaeo, Paléorient, Eurasian Prehistory, Journal of Human Evolution, and the Journal of Palaeolithic Archaeology. He was Chair of the Archaeological Geology Division of the Geological Society of America.

== Awards ==
April, 2013: Alexander von Humboldt Fellowship; University of Tübingen, Germany

January, 2010: Pomerance Award for Scientific Contributions to Archaeology, Archaeological Institute of America

March, 2008: Fryxell Award, Society for American Archaeology

January-August, 2004: Alexander von Humboldt Senior Award; University of Tübingen, Germany

April 2002: Rip Rapp Award, Archaeological Geology Division, Geological Society of America

September-December, 1998: French Government Fellowship (“Poste Rouge”, C.N.R.S. Senior Scientist) at the Centre de Recherche Archéologique, Valbonne
