= Güləzi =

- Municipality
- Location within Azerbaijan
- Coordinates: 41°09′25″N 48°34′48″E
- Country: Azerbaijan
- District: Quba

Population
  - Total: 1,375
- Time zone: UTC+4 (AZT)
  - Summer (DST): UTC+5 (AZT)

Güləzi (also, Gulezi and Gulezy) is a village and municipality in the Quba District of Azerbaijan. It has a population of 1,375. The municipality consists of the villages of Güləzi, Aydınkənd, Dalaqo, Kunxırt, Xanagahyolu, and Xırt.
