= Aydınkənd =

- Location within Azerbaijan
- Coordinates: 41°07′38″N 48°34′13″E
- Country: Azerbaijan
- Rayon: Quba
- Municipality: Güləzi

Population (2009)
  - Total: 51
- Time zone: UTC+4 (AZT)
  - Summer (DST): UTC+5 (AZT)

Aydınkənd (also, Aydmkənd, Aydi-Kend”, and Aydynkend) is a village in the Quba Rayon of Azerbaijan. The village forms part of the municipality of Güləzi.
