= Xanagahyolu =

Human settlement in Azerbaijan

Coordinates: 41°10′N 48°32′E

Xanagahyolu (also, Xanagah yolu) is a village in the municipality of Güləzi in the Quba Rayon of Azerbaijan.
