= Xocadoy =

Village in Lerik District, Azerbaijan

Coordinates: 38°40′N 48°17′E

Xocadoy is a village in the municipality of Aşağı Amburdərə in the Lerik Rayon of Azerbaijan.
