= Vıjaker =

- Municipality
- Location within Azerbaijan
- Coordinates: 38°37′N 48°33′E
- Country: Azerbaijan
- Rayon: Lerik

Population
  - Total: 284
- Time zone: UTC+4 (AZT)
  - Summer (DST): UTC+5 (AZT)

Vıjaker (also, Vijəker, Vazhaker, and Vyzhaker) is a village and municipality in the Lerik Rayon of Azerbaijan. It has a population of 284. The municipality consists of the villages of Vijaker and Qışlaq.
