= Paléorient =

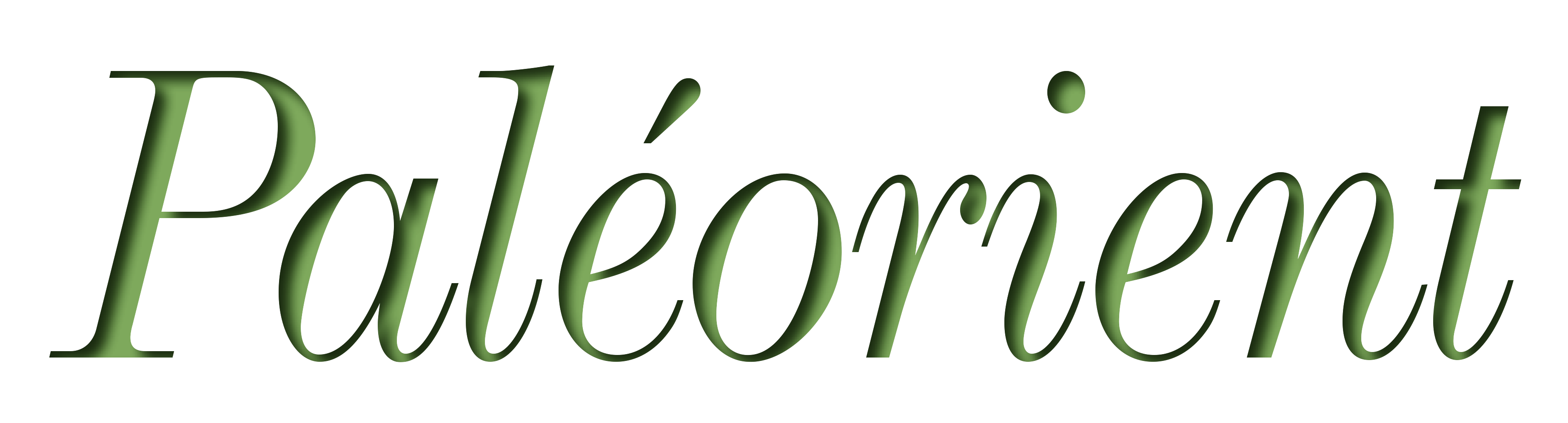
- Discipline: Ancient Near East
- Language: English, French
- Edited by: Johnny Samuele Baldi, Benjamin Mutin

Publication details
- History: 1973–present
- Publisher: CNRS Éditions (France)
- Frequency: Biannually

Standard abbreviations
- ISO 4: Paléorient

Indexing
- ISSN: 0153-9345 (print); 1957-701X (web)
- LCCN: 88649200
- JSTOR: 01539345
- OCLC no.: 163576320

Links
- Journal homepage; Online access at Persée; Archive at OpenEdition Journals

Paléorient is a biannual peer-reviewed academic journal covering research on the prehistory and protohistory of southwestern and central Asia. Its aim is to promote discussions between prehistorians, archaeologists and anthropologists whose field of research goes from the eastern Mediterranean to the Indus, from central Asia to the Persian Gulf, as well as specialists of various disciplines related to the evolution of humans in their natural environment from the Palaeolithic period to the Early Bronze Age. The journal publishes biannually review papers, information notes and book reviews – mainly in English and in French, and some of the issues are thematic. The editors-in-chief are Johnny Samuele Baldi and Benjamin Mutin (Maison de Sciences de l'Homme – Mondes).

== History ==
The journal was established in 1973 by Jean Perrot and Bernard Vandermeersch with the help of the Wener Gren Foundation and was first published by Klincksiek Editions (1973) and later by the Association Paléorient (1974–1975). In 1975 it became a journal of the French National Centre for Scientific Research; it is presently published by CNRS Éditions. When it was established in 1973 the journal was taken in by the Laboratoire de paléontologie des vertébrés et de paléontologie humaine at the Université Paris VI, and from 1997 by the Maison de l’archéologie et de l’ethnologie René Ginouvès (now Maison des Sciences de l’Homme - Mondes).

== Access ==
The entire journal is available online on the free portal Persée and on the JSTOR platform, both with a two-year moving wall. Issues published since 2019 have been freely accessible on OpenEdition Journals since December 2021.

== Editors-in-chief ==
The following persons are or have been editor-in-chief:

- 1973–1994: Jean Perrot and Bernard Vandermeersch (founding editors)
- 1994–2004: Geneviève Dollfus
- 2004–2012: Éric Cocqueugniot
- 2013–2019: Frédérique Brunet and Sylvain Soriano
- 2020–2024: Victoria de Castéja and Martin Sauvage
- 2024–present: Johnny Samuele Baldi and Benjamin Mutin
