= Yuxarı Amburdərə =

Yukhary Amburdere
- Azerbaijani: Yuxarı Amburdərə
- Location within Azerbaijan
- Coordinates: 38°39′N 48°18′E
- Country: Azerbaijan
- District: Lerik
- Municipality: Ashaghy Amburdere
- Time zone: UTC+4 (AZT)
  - Summer (DST): UTC+5 (AZT)

Yuxarı Amburdərə (also, Yukhary Amburdere) is a village in the Lerik District of Azerbaijan. The village forms part of the municipality of Ashaghy Amburdere.
