= Qışlaq, Lachin =

Qışlaq
- Location within Azerbaijan Location within East Zangezur Economic Region
- Coordinates: 39°36′14″N 46°42′30″E
- Country: Azerbaijan
- District: Lachin
- Time zone: UTC+4 (AZT)
  - Summer (DST): UTC+5 (AZT)

Qışlaq (also Gyshlag and Gishlag) is a village in the Lachin District of Azerbaijan.
