= Şiyəkəran =

- Municipality
- Location within Azerbaijan
- Coordinates: 38°35′N 48°52′E
- Country: Azerbaijan
- Rayon: Astara

Population
  - Total: 4,789
- Time zone: UTC+4 (AZT)

Şiyəkəran (also, Sheakeran, Shikhakeran, Shirakeran’, and Shiyakeran) is a village and municipality in the Astara Rayon of Azerbaijan. It has a population of 4,789.
