= Aşağı Amburdərə =

Ashaghy Amburdere
- Municipality
- Azerbaijani: Aşağı Ambudərə
- Location within Azerbaijan
- Coordinates: 38°40′05″N 48°22′39″E
- Country: Azerbaijan
- District: Lerik

Population
  - Total: 539
- Time zone: UTC+4 (AZT)
  - Summer (DST): UTC+5 (AZT)

Aşağı Amburdərə (or Ashaghy Amburdere) is a village and municipality in the Lerik District of Azerbaijan. It has a population of 539. The municipality consists of the villages of Aşağı Amburdərə, Yuxarı Amburdərə, Qışlaq, Xocadoy, and Hilədərə.
