= Utalgi =

- Location within Azerbaijan
- Coordinates: 40°13′30″N 49°19′25″E
- Country: Azerbaijan
- Rayon: Absheron
- Time zone: UTC+4 (AZT)
  - Summer (DST): UTC+5 (AZT)

Utalgi (also, Utal’gi, Gyshlag and Utalghy-Akhtarma) is a village in the Absheron Rayon of Azerbaijan.
