= Xırt =

- Location within Azerbaijan
- Coordinates: 41°07′44″N 48°35′34″E
- Country: Azerbaijan
- District: Quba
- Municipality: Güləzi
- Time zone: UTC+4 (AZT)
  - Summer (DST): UTC+5 (AZT)

Xırt (also, Khyrt, Khirt’ and Gyshlag) is a village in the Quba District of Azerbaijan. The village forms part of the municipality of Güləzi.
