= Şıxakəran =

- Municipality
- Location within Azerbaijan
- Coordinates: 38°41′01″N 48°50′00″E
- Country: Azerbaijan
- Rayon: Lankaran

Population
  - Total: 2,906
- Time zone: UTC+4 (AZT)
  - Summer (DST): UTC+5 (AZT)

Şıxakəran (also, Şıxəkəran, Shikhakeran’, and Shykhakeran) is a village and municipality in the Lankaran Rayon of Azerbaijan. It has a population of 2,906.
