= Qışlaq, Aşağı Amburdərə =

Village in Lerik District, Azerbaijan

Coordinates: 38.668056°N 48.3775°E

Qışlaq (also, Gyshlag) is a village in the municipality of Aşağı Amburdərə in the Lerik District of Azerbaijan.
