= Qışlaq, Vıjaker =

Village in Lerik District, Azerbaijan

Coordinates: 38.616667°N 48.55°E

Qışlaq (also, Gyshlag) is a village in the municipality of Vijaker in the Lerik District of Azerbaijan.
