= Jean Perrot =

French archaeologist (1920–2012)

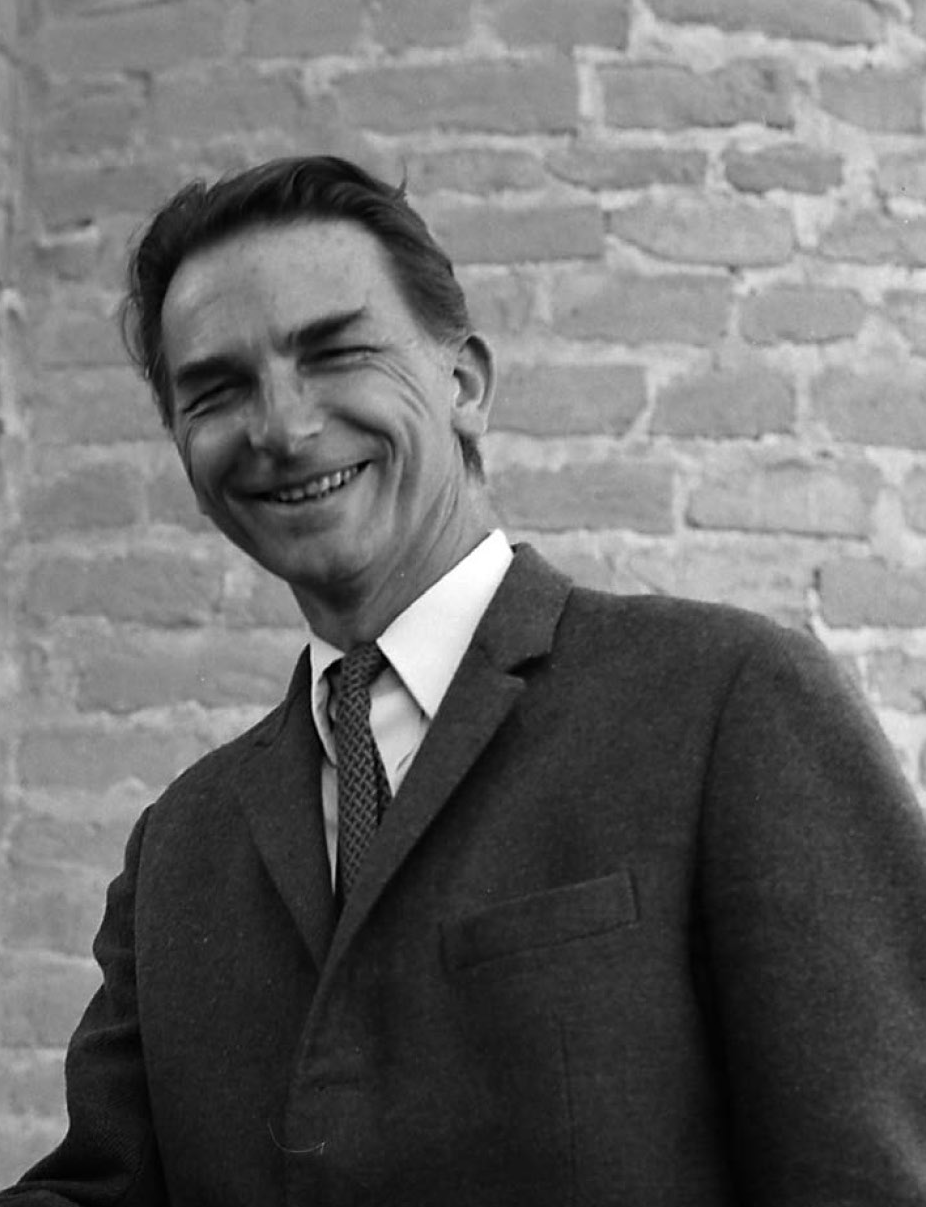
- Photograph of Jean Perrot, 1970
- Born: 1920
- Died: 2012 (aged 91–92)
- Known for: Work on the prehistory of the Middle East and Near East
- Scientific career
- Fields: Archaeology

Jean Perrot (French: [ʒɑ̃ pɛʁo]; 10 June 1920 – 24 December 2012) was a French archaeologist who specialised in the late prehistory of the Middle East and Near East.

== Biography ==
Perrot was a graduate of the Ecole du Louvre where he studied under two experts in Syrian archaeology; André Parrot and René Dussaud. He went on to study at the École biblique et archéologique française de Jérusalem in 1945. He researched a number of ancient sites in Iran, Israel and Turkey, animating the research at international level. He first went to Iran in 1968, a year after the retirement of Roman Ghirshman, to head the Delegation Archéologique Français (DAFI) and excavations of the country's ancient sites. He headed a multidisciplinary team in conjunction with the Iranian Centre of Archaeological Research, including experts from France, Iran and the United States who continued studies until the revolution in 1979. He worked on sites such as Susa and Jafar Abad and took measures to safeguard the vestiges of the Achaemenid period (between the sixth and fourth century BC). His notable discoveries included ancient items such as the headless statue of Darius which is now housed in the National Museum of Iran in Tehran.

In Israel Perrot excavated at Munhata, Ain Mallaha and the Chalcolithic sites at Abu Matar and Bir es-Safadi near Beersheba, belonging to the so-called Beer Sheva culture.

In 1952, Perrot founded the "Mission archéologique française", now called the French Research Center in Jerusalem; a joint research unit of the General Directorate for International Cooperation and Development and the CNRS. It is the CNRS's oldest foreign branch and became a permanent archaeological base in 1974. The current director since 1996 is Dominique Bourel.

In 1973, Perrot founded the notable journal Paléorient with Bernard Vandermeersch along with the aid of the Wenner-Gren Foundation. In 1975, this became a publication of the CNRS. The journal is now published twice a year and distributed in twenty-two countries, it is recognized for presentations and discussions of research in all aspects of the prehistory and protohistory of the near and middle east.

Perrot returned to France to become director of the CNRS, which he joined in 1946 and for which he was an honorary research director and correspondent.

== Selected bibliography ==
- Perrot, Jean., Et ils sortirent du paradis ... , carnets d'un archéologue en Orient, 1945–1995, Editions de Fallois, 334 pages, 1997.
- Perrot, Jean., Le palais de Darius à Suse: une résidence royale sur la route de Persépolis à Babylone, Presses de l'université Paris-Sorbonne, 520 pages, 2010.
- Perrot, J. and Y. Madjidzadeh, 2003 Découvertes récentes á Jiroft (sud du plateau Iranien), CRAIBL, pp. 1087–1102.
- Perrot, Jean, Darius le Grand - Roi de Perse - Roi de Babylone – Rois des Rois – Pharaon d’Egypte (522-486 av. J.-C.), Dossiers d’Archéologie, hors série n° 23, janvier 2013, 78 pages.
