= Tsaghkashat, Nagorno-Karabakh =

Tsaghkashat / Gyshlag Ծաղկաշատ / Qışlaq
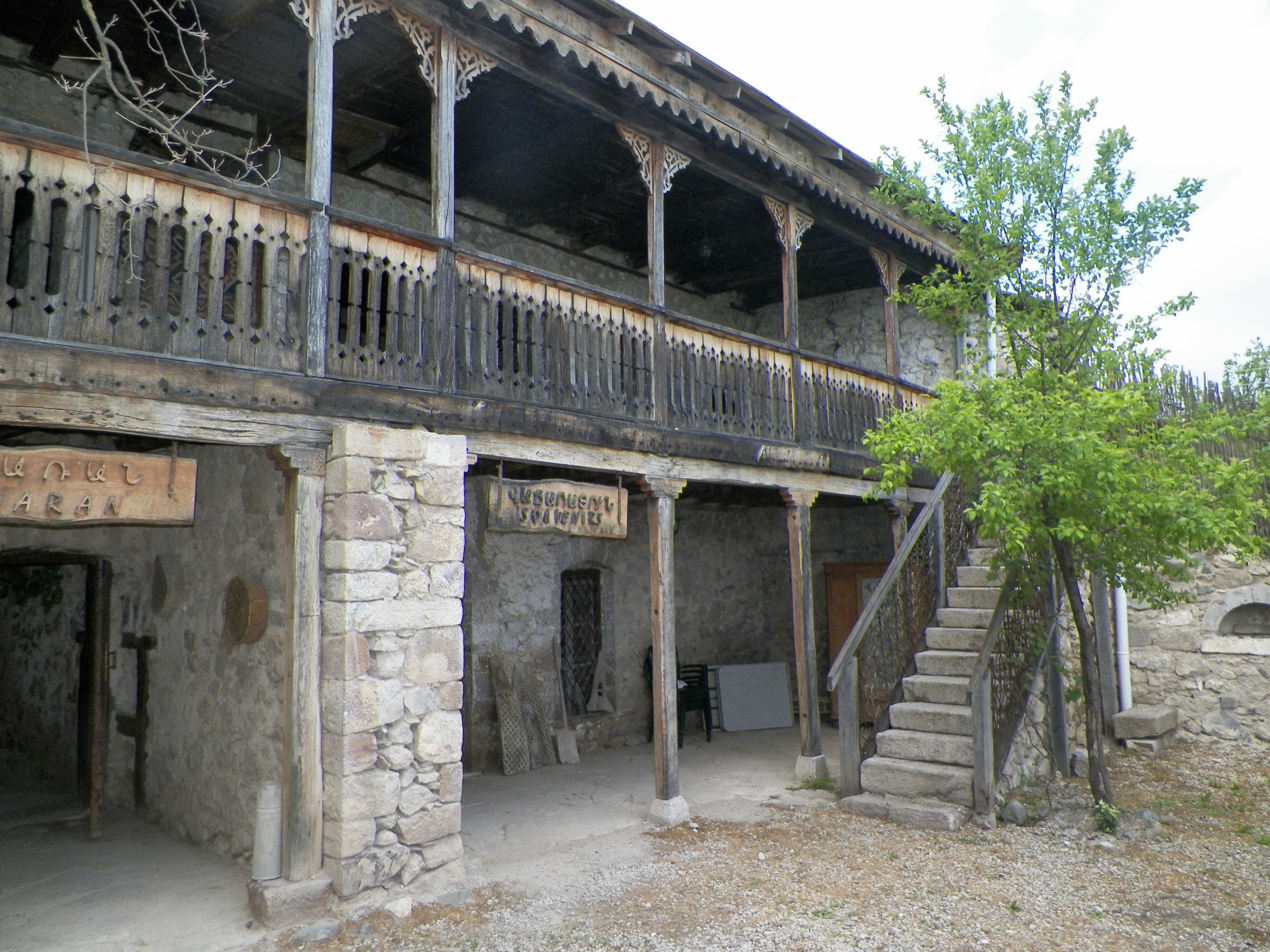
- Nikol Duman House Museum in the village

- Location within Azerbaijan
- Coordinates: 39°58′26″N 46°43′01″E
- Country: Azerbaijan
  - District: Khojaly
- Elevation: 803 m (2,635 ft)

Population (2015)
  - Total: 172
- Time zone: UTC+4 (AZT)

Tsaghkashat (Armenian: Ծաղկաշատ, lit. 'plentiful flowers') or Gyshlag (Armenian: Ղշլաղ, romanized: Ghshlagh; Azerbaijani: Qışlaq) is a village located in the Khojaly District of Azerbaijan, in the disputed region of Nagorno-Karabakh. Until 2023 it was controlled by the breakaway Republic of Artsakh. The village had an ethnic Armenian-majority population until the expulsion of the Armenian population of Nagorno-Karabakh by Azerbaijan following the 2023 Azerbaijani offensive in Nagorno-Karabakh.

== Toponymy ==
The village is also known as Keshish Kand and Kishlagkend.

== History ==
During the Soviet period, the village was a part of the Askeran District of the Nagorno-Karabakh Autonomous Oblast.

== Historical heritage sites ==
Historical heritage sites in and around the village include tombs from the 2nd–1st millennia BCE and the Early Middle Ages, the 12th/13th-century village of Vaka (Armenian: Վաքա), a 12th/13th-century khachkar, the nearby medieval village of Shinategh (Armenian: Շինատեղ), a chapel from the Middle Ages 1 km to the south, the 18th-century religious site of Gharabek (Armenian: Ղարաբեկ) 2 km to the south, an 18th-century cemetery, the 19th-century church of Surb Astvatsatsin (Armenian: Սուրբ Աստվածածին, lit. 'Holy Mother of God'), and the Nikol Duman House Museum displaying 19th/20th-century life in the village.

== Economy and culture ==
The population is mainly engaged in agriculture and animal husbandry. As of 2015, the village has a municipal building, a house of culture, a secondary school and a medical centre.

== Demographics ==
The village has an ethnic Armenian-majority population, had 200 inhabitants in 2005, and 172 inhabitants in 2015.

== Notable people ==
- Nikol Duman (12 January 1867 – 23 September 1914)

== Gallery ==
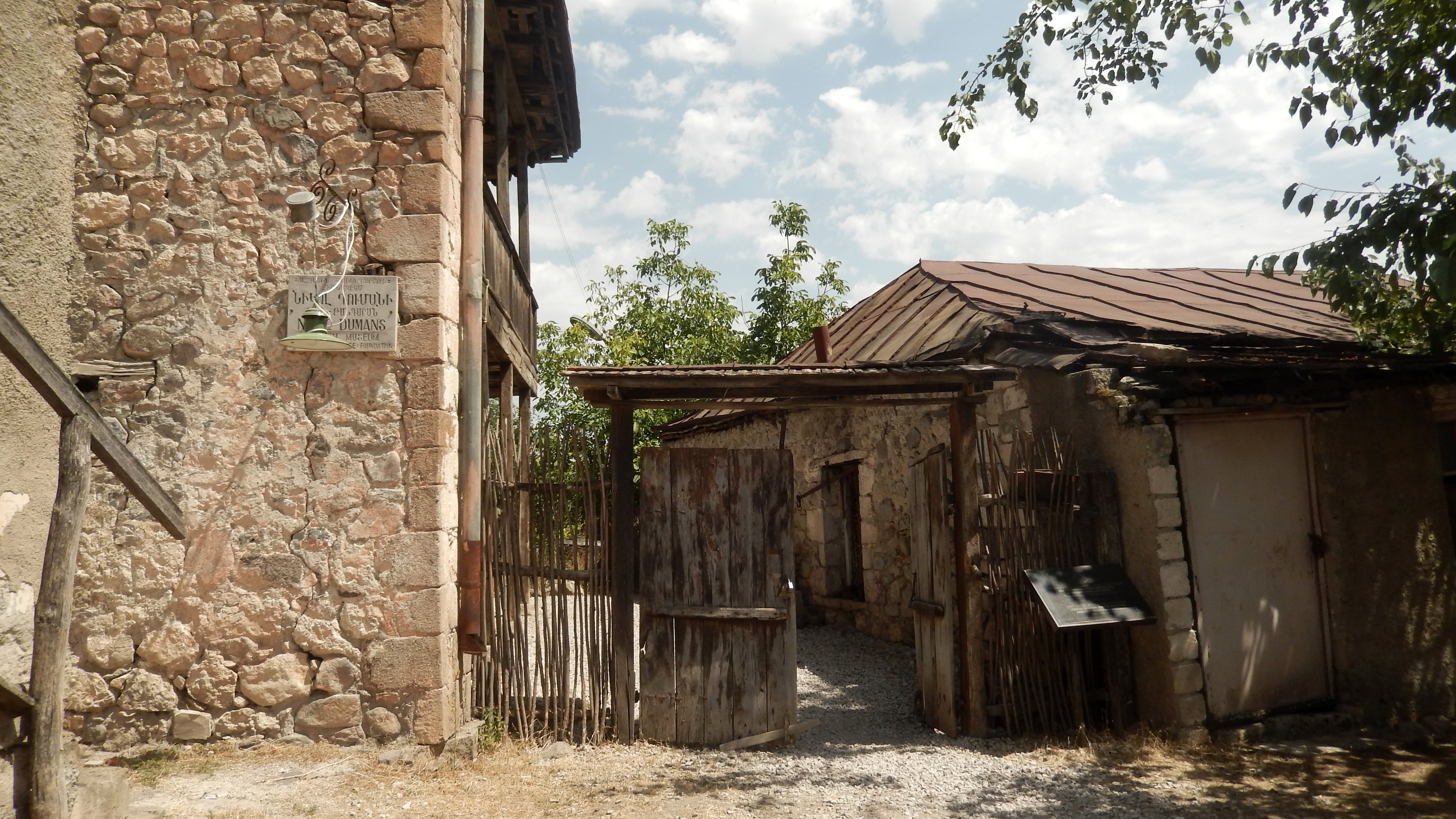
Museum in the village

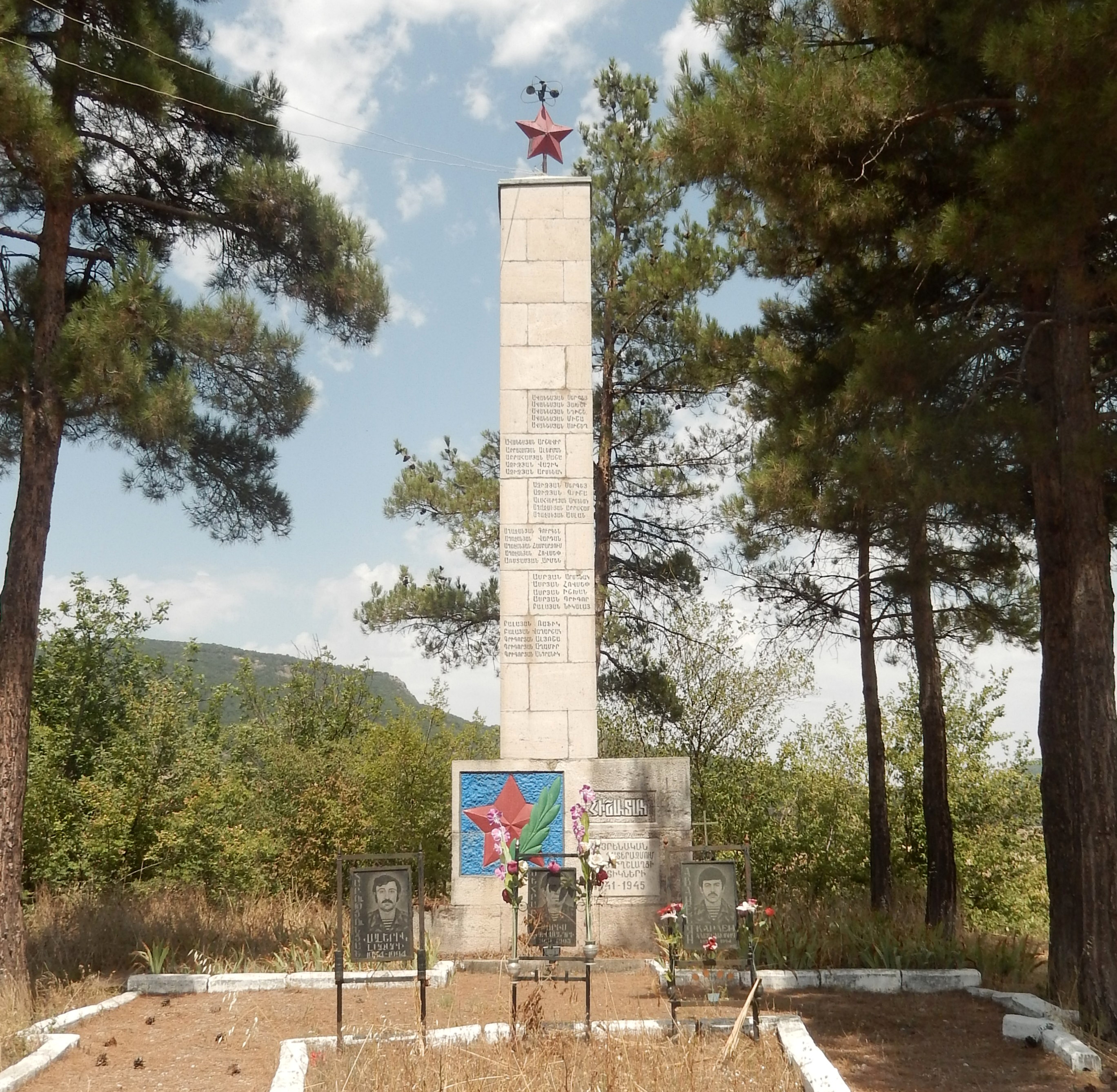
World War II monument

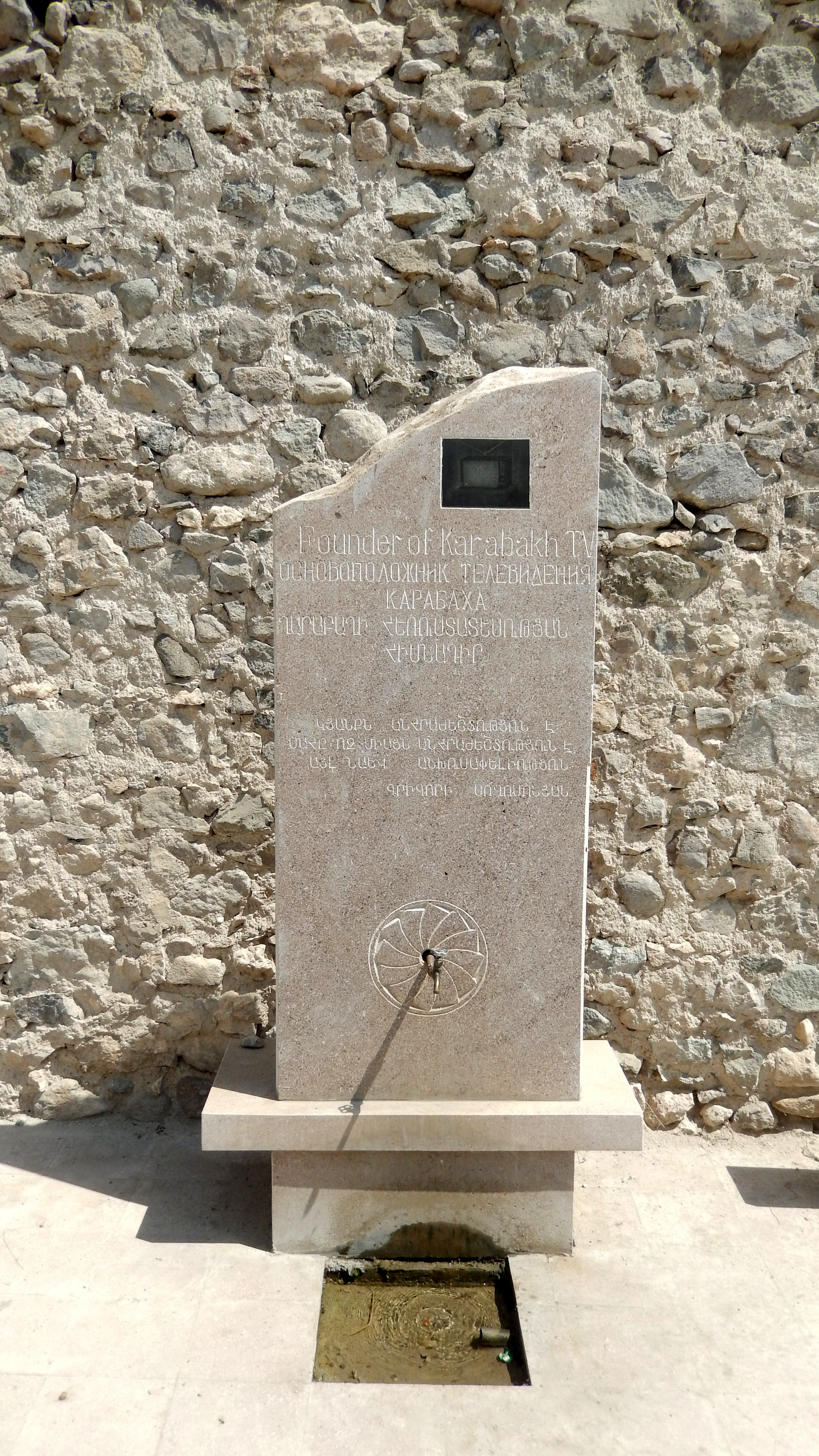
Memorial

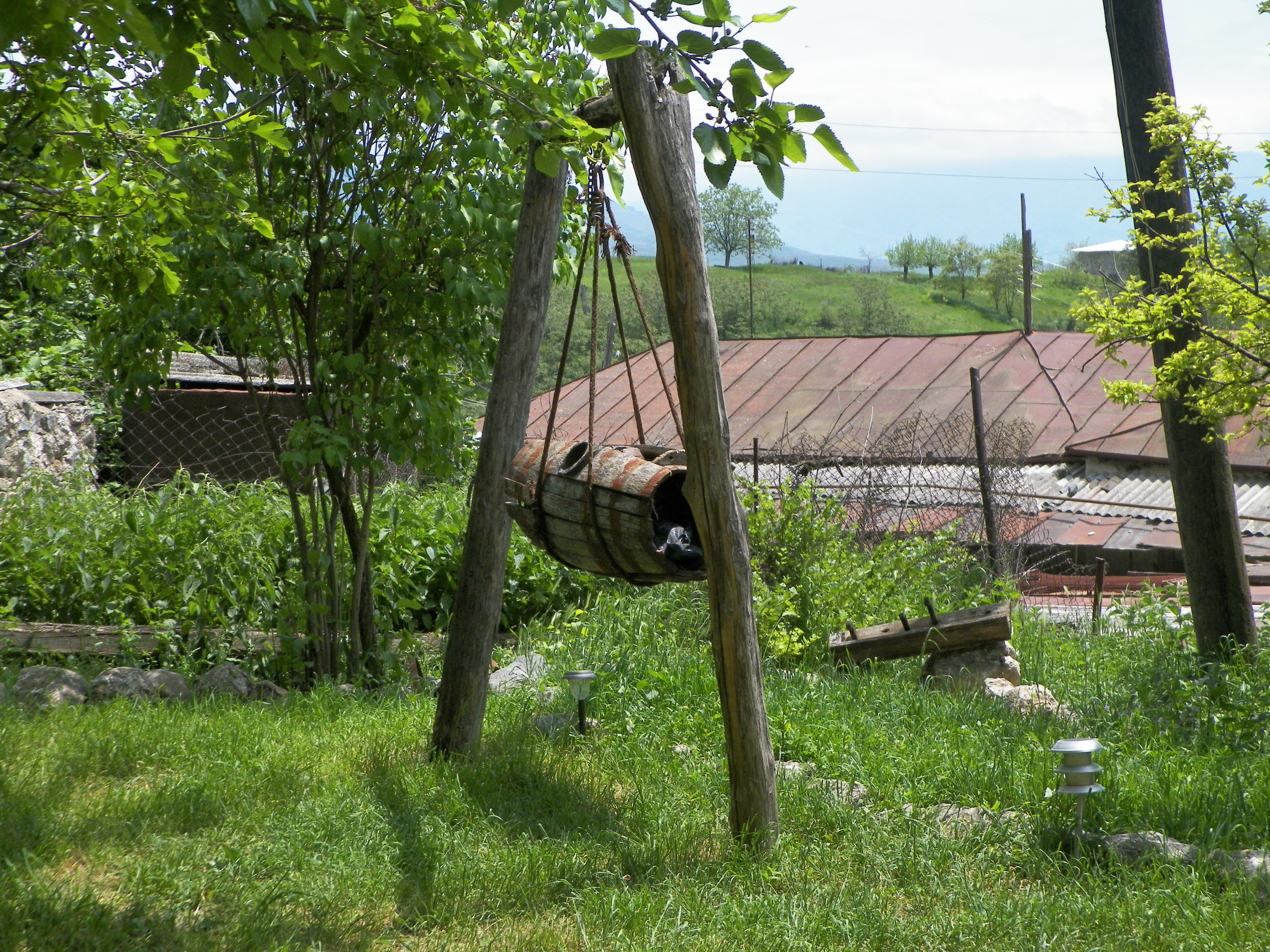
A view of the village

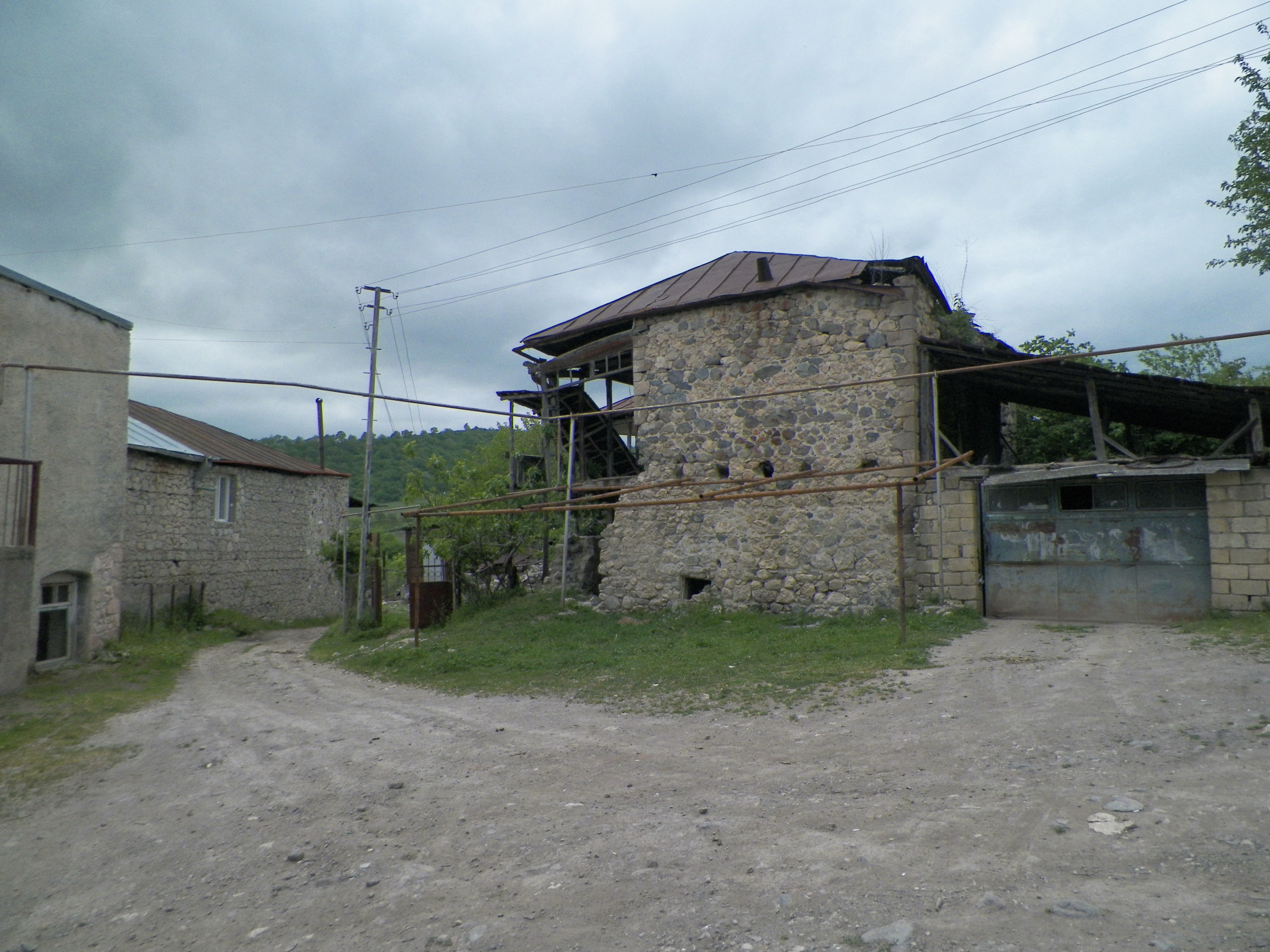
A view of the village
