= Qışlaq, Zərigümaco =

Village in Lerik District, Azerbaijan

Coordinates: 38.7005°N 48.6352°E

Qışlaq (also, Gyshlag) is a village in the municipality of Zərigümaco in the Lerik District of Azerbaijan.
