= Siloam inscription =

Hebrew inscription

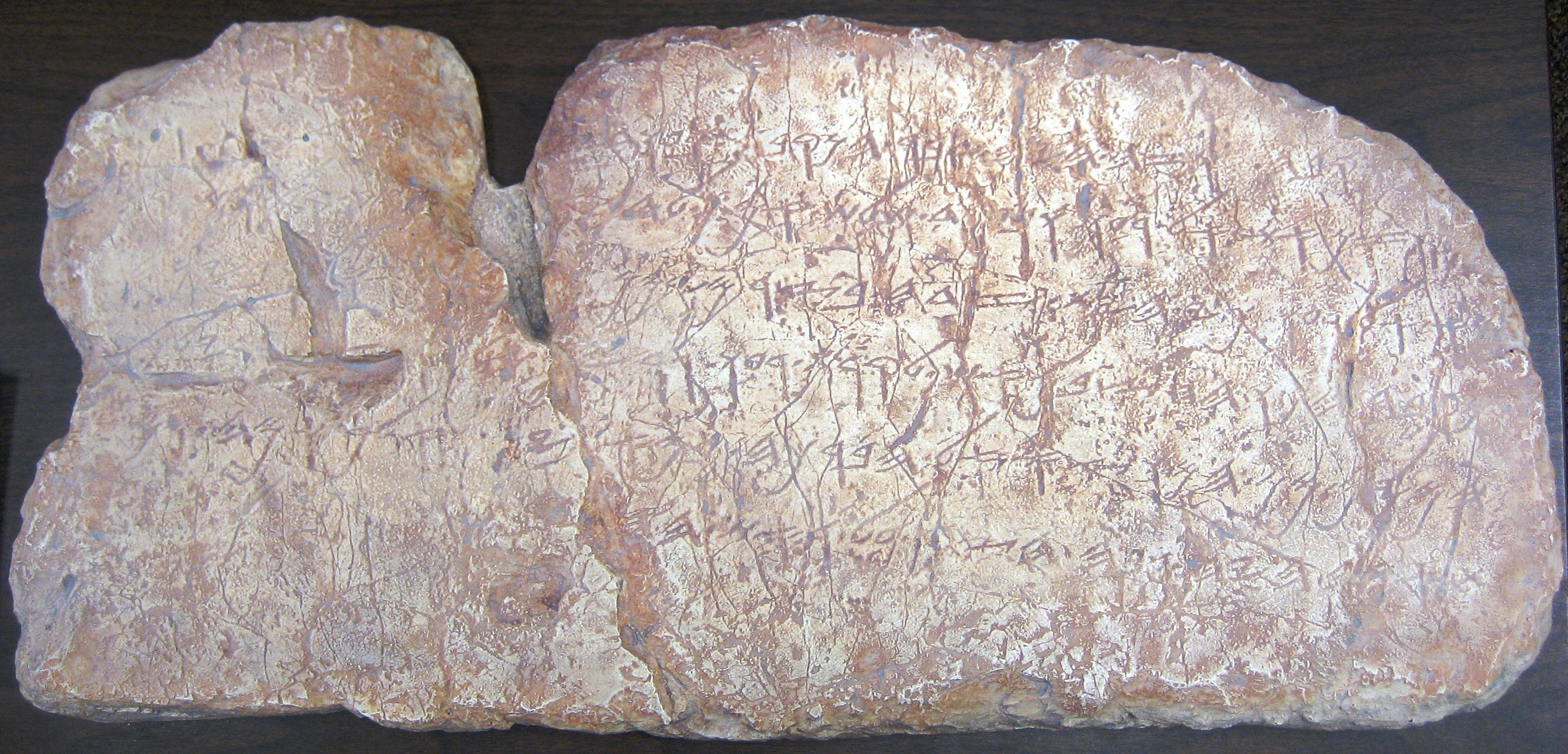
- Type: Stone inscription
- Material: Limestone
- Writing: Hebrew (Paleo-Hebrew script)
- Created: c. 700 BC
- Discovered: 1880; Siloam Tunnel; City of David, Jerusalem
- Discovered by: Student
- Place: Istanbul Archaeology Museums
- Identification: KAI 189; 2195 T
- Culture: Ancient Israel and Judah

The Siloam inscription, Silwan inscription or Shiloah inscription (Hebrew: כתובת השילוח), known as KAI 189, is a Hebrew inscription found in the Siloam tunnel which brings water from the Gihon Spring to the Pool of Siloam, located in the City of David in East Jerusalem neighborhood of Silwan ("Siloam" in the Bible). The inscription records the construction of the tunnel, which has been dated to the 8th century BC on the basis of the writing style. It is the only known ancient inscription from ancient Israel and Judah which commemorates a public construction work, despite such inscriptions being commonplace in Egyptian and Mesopotamian archaeology.

It is among the oldest extant records of its kind written in Hebrew using the Paleo-Hebrew alphabet, a regional variant of the Phoenician alphabet. The inscription is part of the collections of the Istanbul Archaeology Museum.

== History ==
=== Discovery ===
The Siloam tunnel was discovered in 1838 by Edward Robinson. Despite the tunnel being examined extensively during the 19th century by Robinson, Charles Wilson, and Charles Warren, they all missed discovering the inscription, probably due to the accumulated mineral deposits making it barely noticeable.

In 1880 a 16-year-old pupil of Conrad Schick, head of the London Society for Promoting Christianity Amongst the Jews' institute for vocational training, found the inscription when exploring the tunnel. It was cut in the rock on the eastern side, about 19 feet into the tunnel from Siloam Pool. Schick explained in his initial publication Phoenician Inscription in the Pool of Siloam:

... one of my pupils, when climbing down the southern side of [the aqueduct], stumbled over the broken bits of rock and fell into the water. On rising to the surface, he discovered some marks like letters on the wall of rock. I set off with the necessary things to examine his discovery.

The pupil was later identified as Jacob Eliahu, later Spafford, following his adoption by Horatio Spafford. Seventy years later, in 1950, Eliahu's adoptive sister, Bertha Spafford Vester, wrote of the discovery story, which took place a year prior to her arrival in the city:

Jacob was above the average in intellect, with the oriental aptitude for languages. He spoke five fluently, with a partial knowledge of several others. He was interested in archaeology, and the year before we came to Jerusalem he discovered the Siloam Inscription... His imagination was fired by learning about the subterranean tunnel in the Ophal Hill that had been excavated by King Hezekiah to bring water inside the threatened city ... It is supposed to be haunted by a dragon or genie ... Nevertheless, Jacob determined to explore the tunnel ... Jacob, feeling his way, suddenly was conscious that the chisel marks had changed and were now going from left to right. He realized he must be in the exact place where the King's workmen had met under the city. Carefully he felt all around the walls, and was certain that his fingers detected an inscription chiseled in the stone.

=== Removal ===
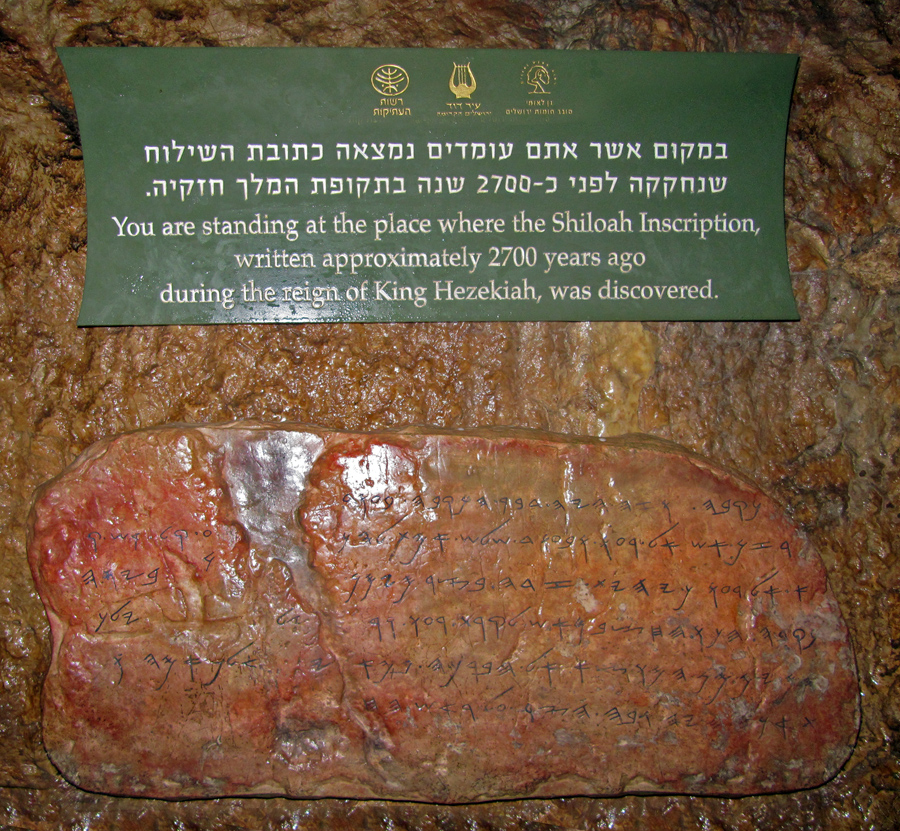
A copy of the inscription, in its original location inside Hezekiah's Tunnel, 2010

In July 1890 a resident of Jerusalem had the inscription removed from the wall of the tunnel. During this work the inscription cracked into six or seven pieces and several letters were damaged at the breakpoints.

The Ottoman government in Jerusalem, led by the Mutasarrif of Jerusalem, Ibrahim Hakki Pasha, did not become aware of what had happened until the end of the year, when they were alerted by the director of the Turkish Museum in Istanbul. Under Ottoman law, the government was the owner of all ancient monuments found within the empire, so they launched a search for the inscription. During 1891, both the real and a forged copy were given to Ibrahim Hakki Pasha; the Mutasarrif put the inscription on display in the Jerusalem Serāj, where it was viewed by large crowds. The inscription was subsequently sent to Istanbul.

Casts of the inscription in situ had been made by Hermann Guthe in 1881. One was held by the Schneller Orphanage, the second broke during the transport to Germany and a third was held by the Deutscher Verein zur Erforschung Palästinas (German Association for the Exploration of Palestine, DVEP).

=== Further claims ===
In 2022 much media attention focused on an announcement by controversial retired Jewish history professor Gershon Galil that he and archaeologist Eli Shukron had examined high-quality photographs of the inscription and found additional lines of text on it, as well as in the tunnel below where the inscription had been removed. This prompted an open letter from other Israeli academics criticizing the announcement of finds to the media without proper publication and peer review in a professional journal, or even providing the photographs to other researchers.

== Biblical references ==
The ancient city of Jerusalem, being on a mountain, was naturally defensible from almost all sides, but its major source of fresh water, the Gihon spring, was on the side of the cliff overlooking the Kidron valley. The Bible records that King Hezekiah, fearful that the Assyrians would lay siege to the city, blocked the spring's water outside the city and diverted it through a channel into the Pool of Siloam.

- 2 Kings 20, 20: "And the rest of the events of Hezekiah and all his mighty deeds, and how he made the conduit and the pool, and he brought the water into the city, they are written in the book of the chronicles of the kings of Judah."
- 2 Chronicles 32, 3–4: "And he took counsel with his officers and his mighty men to stop up the waters of the fountains that were outside the city, and they assisted him. And a large multitude gathered and stopped up all the fountains and the stream that flowed in the midst of the land, saying, "Why should the kings of Assyria come and find much water?""

== Translation ==
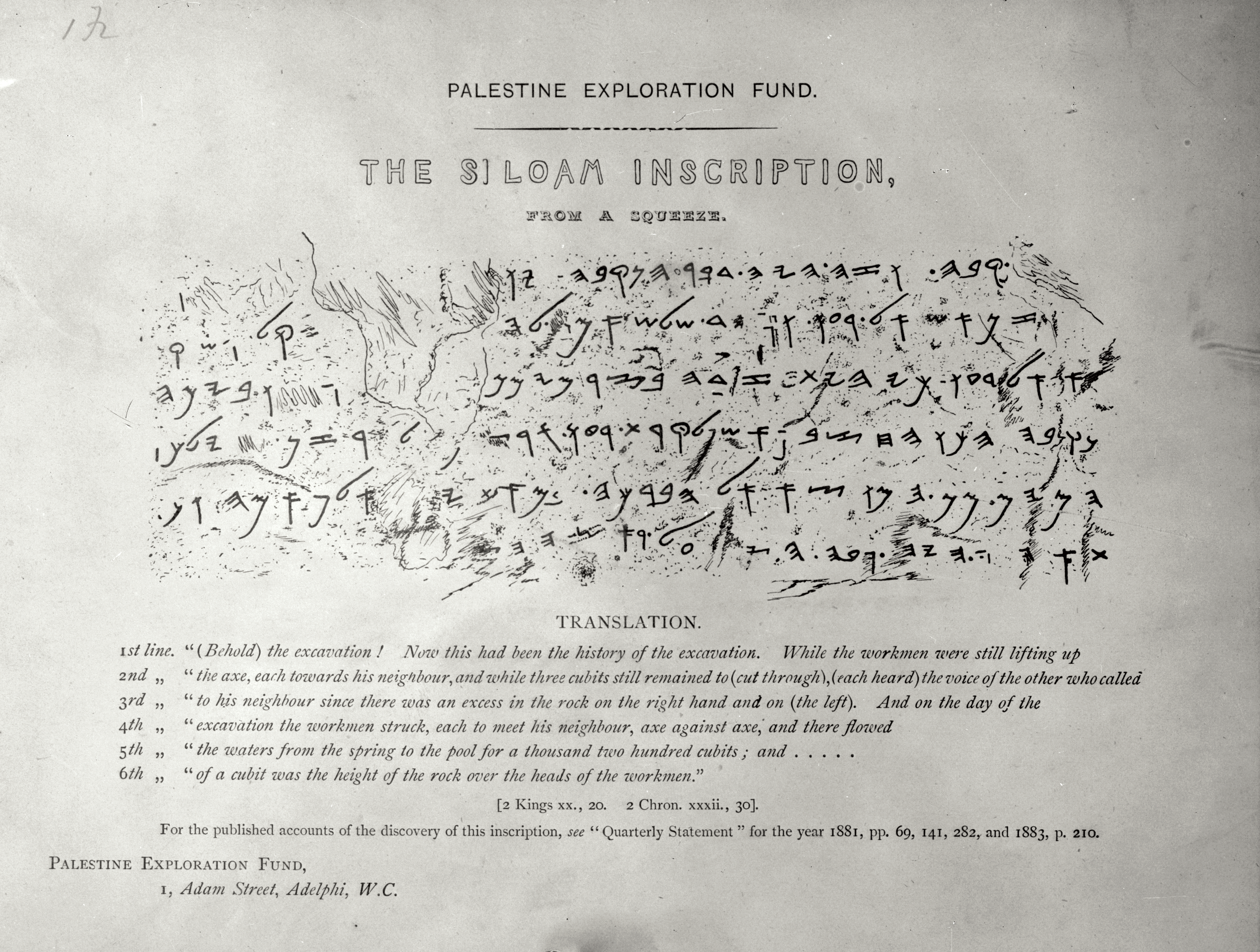
A copy of the inscription, with English translation

As the inscription was unreadable at first due to the deposits, Professor Archibald Sayce was the first to make a tentative reading, and later the text was cleaned with an acid solution making the reading more legible. The inscription contains 6 lines, of which the first is damaged. The words are separated by dots. Only the word zadah on the third line is of doubtful translation, and the Hebrew letter zayn thought here to be interchanged with tzadi, meaning "its side".

The passage reads:

Behold the tunnel. Now this is the matter of the tunnel. While the stone-cutters were lifting the axe
one man towards his neighbor, and while there remained three cubits to be cut, the voice of a man could be heard
calling out to his neighbor, for there had been [only] its side deviation (Heb. zadah) in the rock-face [where they were supposed to meet up], on the right and on the left,
and on the day when the tunnel was being cut out, the stone-cutters struck each man in front of his neighbor, axe against axe
and the waters from the source flowed into the pool for [a distance of] 1,200 cubits. Now one-hundred
cubits was the height over the head of the stone-cutters.

The inscription hence records the construction of the tunnel; according to the text the work began at both ends simultaneously and proceeded until the stonecutters met in the middle. However, this idealised account does not quite reflect the reality of the tunnel; where the two sides meet is an abrupt right angled join, and the centres do not line up. It has been theorized that Hezekiah's engineers depended on acoustic sounding to guide the tunnelers and this is supported by the explicit use of this technique as described in the Siloam Inscription. The frequently ignored final sentence of this inscription provides further evidence: "And the height of the rock above the heads of the laborers was 100 cubits." This indicates that the engineers were well aware of the distance to the surface above the tunnel at various points in its progression.

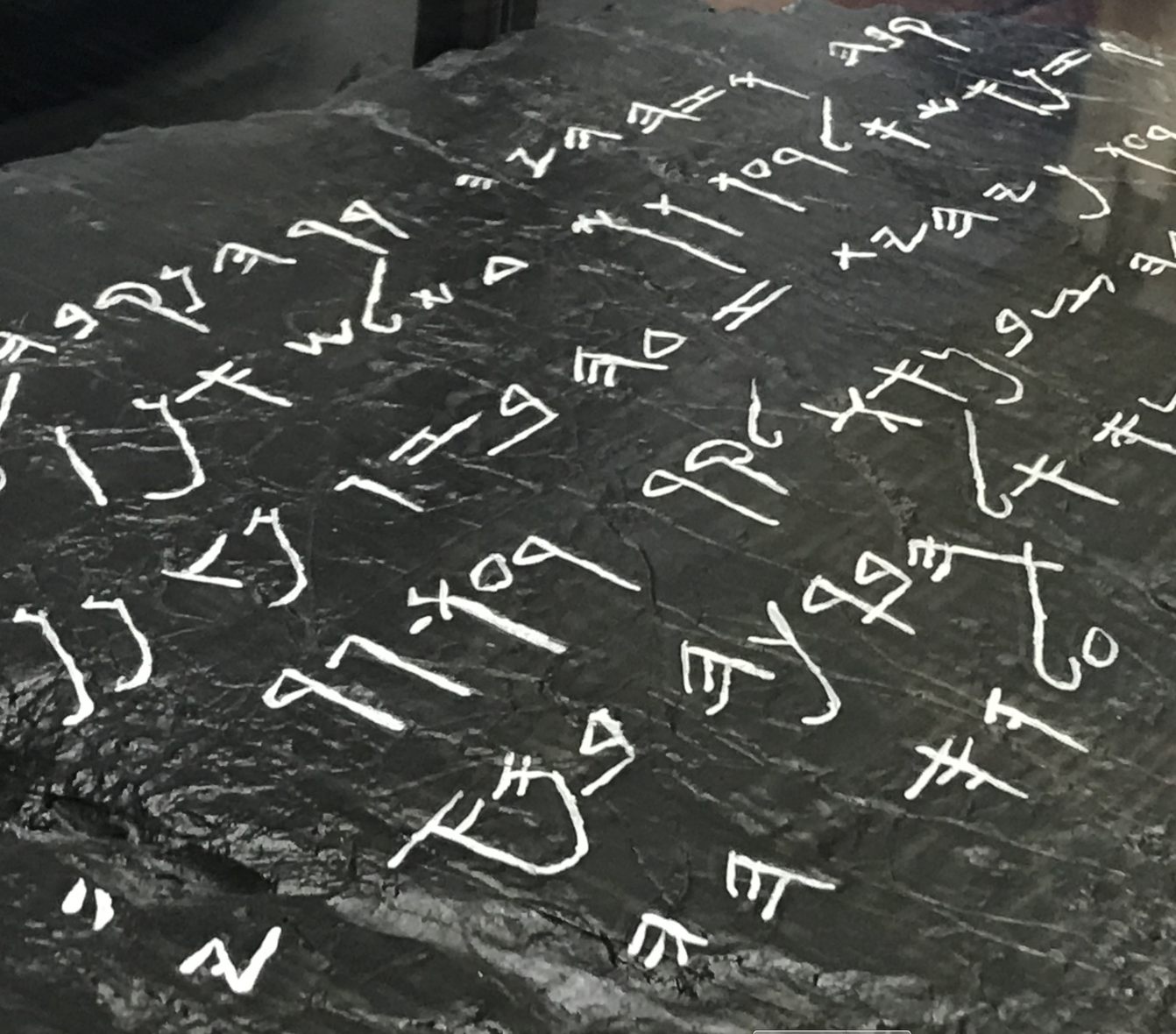
Reproduction, colorant-aided for legibility

While traditionally identified as a commemorative inscription, one archaeologist has suggested that it may be a votive offering inscription.

== Ownership ==
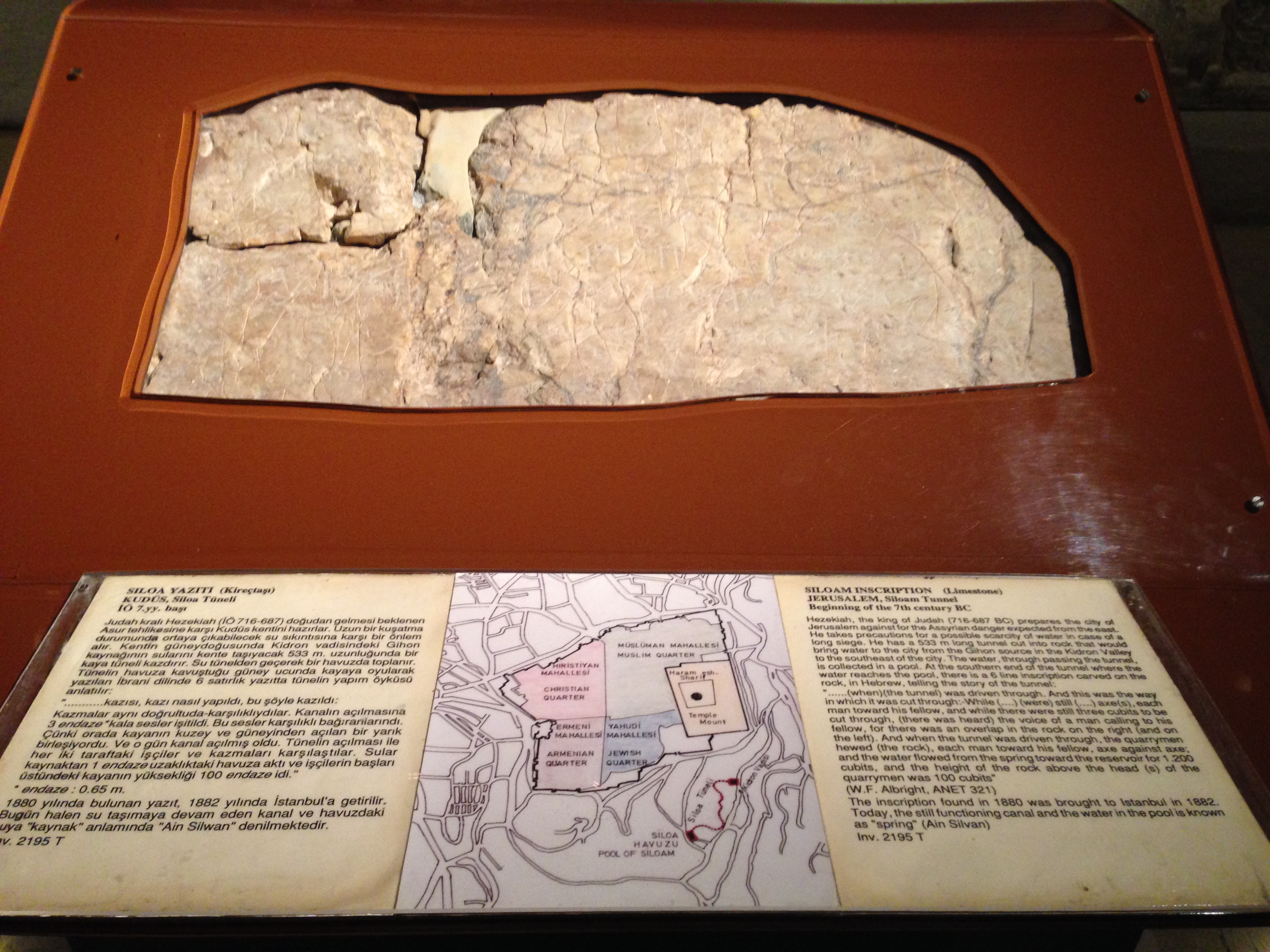
The inscription and display case at the Istanbul Archaeology Museum, 2014.

The inscription is on exhibition at the Istanbul Archaeology Museum, one of three ancient inscriptions from the region held by the museum (the other two being the Gezer calendar and the Temple Warning inscription). A replica is on display at the Israel Museum in Jerusalem.

Turkey has refused Israel's request to be sent the Siloam inscription, and other artifacts unearthed in Ottoman Palestine and transferred to Turkey. Scholars have commented that the inscription has little, if any, significance to Turkey, and as evidence point to the fact that it was not on display in a public gallery in the Istanbul Archaeology Museum. Hershel Shanks, founder of the Biblical Archaeology Review, has written that Turkey should be amenable to a repatriation of the Siloam inscription, given its own repatriation efforts, and other scholars have questioned whether Turkey can demand that its objects be returned, when its own museums refuse to return artifacts taken from previous colonies.

In September 1998, Benjamin Netanyahu asked then-Turkish prime minister Mesut Yılmaz to return the inscription and, in return, offered Turkey "to go into [Israel's] museums and choose all the finds from the Ottoman period that you want". His offer was rejected.

In 2007, Jerusalem Mayor Uri Lupolianski met with Turkey's ambassador to Israel, Namık Tan, and requested that the tablet be returned to Jerusalem as a "goodwill gesture". Turkey rejected the request, stating that the Siloam inscription was Imperial Ottoman property, and thus the cultural property of the Turkish Republic. President Abdullah Gul said that Turkey would arrange for the inscription to be shown in Jerusalem for a short period, but Turkey never followed though on this, as tensions between the two countries escalated as a result of Israel's blockade of the Gaza Strip

In 2017, Israeli Culture Minister Miri Regev made another offer for the inscription, perhaps jokingly suggesting Israel could provide two elephants for the Gaziantep Zoo in exchange for the inscription.

In March 2022, following the visit of President of Israel Isaac Herzog in Ankara, Israeli media reported that Turkey agreed to return the Siloam Inscription to Jerusalem. However, Turkish media stated that the Turkish government denied this, on the basis that the inscription was found in East Jerusalem, part of the Palestinian territories, "thus, it was out of the question to return it to Israel, a third country in Turkey's view".

== See also ==
- List of artifacts significant to the Bible
- Archaeology of Israel
- Biblical archaeology
- Royal Steward inscription
- Ophel pithos

== Bibliography ==
- Conder, C.R. (1882), "The Siloam Tunnel", Palestine Exploration Fund Quarterly Statement, pp. 122–31.
- Guthe, H. (1890). "Das Schicksal der Siloah-Inschrift". Zeitschrift des Deutschen Palästina-Vereins. 1878-1945. 13 (13). Deutscher Palästina-Verein: 286–288. JSTOR 27928587.
- Lemche, Niels Peter (1998). The Israelites in History and Tradition. Westminster John Knox Press. ISBN 9780664227272.
- Puech, E. (1974), "L'inscription du tunnel de Siloie", RB 81, pp. 196–214
- Sayce, A. (1881), "The Inscription at the Pool of Siloam", Palestine Exploration Fund Quarterly Statement 13.2 (April 1881): 69–73 (editio princeps)
- Sayce, A. (1881), "The Ancient Hebrew Inscription Discovered at the Pool of Siloam in Jerusalem", Palestine Exploration Fund Quarterly Statement 13.3 (July 1881): 141–154.
- Sayce, A.; Conder, C.R.; Taylor, Isaac; Beswick, Samuel & Sulley, H. (1881), "The Ancient Hebrew Inscription Discovered at the Pool of Siloam", Palestine Exploration Fund Quarterly Statement 13.4 (Oct. 1881): 282–297.
- Sayce, A.H. (1888). Records of the Past (New Series). Vol. 1. London: S. Bagster and sons. pp. 168–175. OCLC 490361528.
- Schick, C., "Phoenician Inscription in the Pool of Siloam", Palestine Exploration Fund Quarterly Statement, 1880, pp. 238–39.
- Waterman, H.B. (1882), The Siloam Inscription, The Hebrew Student, Vol. 1, No. 3 (Jun., 1882), pp. 52–53, Published by: The University of Chicago Press
