= Siloam tunnel =

Ancient water channel in Jerusalem

Siloam Tunnel
- נִקְבַּת הַשִּׁלֹחַ (Nikbat HaShiloaḥ) (Hebrew)
- Hezekiah's Tunnel
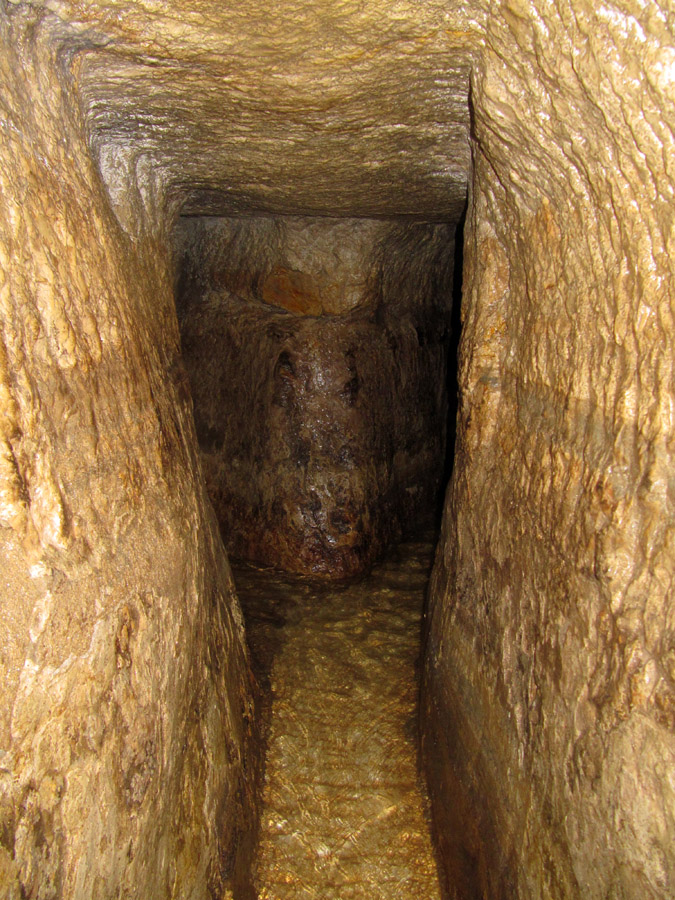
- The Siloam Tunnel
- Interactive map of Siloam Tunnel
- 31.772358°N 35.235673°E
- Type: Water tunnel
- Location: City of David (archaeological site), Jerusalem
- Region: Silwan, Jerusalem

History
- Built: 8th–7th century BC

Site notes
- Discovered: 1838
- Public access: Yes

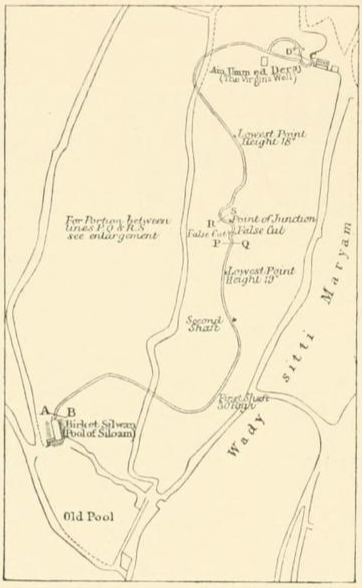
A sketch of the tunnel, including the "Virgin's Well", i.e. the Gihon Spring with the nearby Warren's Shaft, and the Pool of Siloam (both upper and lower/older), by Charles Warren and Claude Reignier Conder, 1884

The newer Siloam Tunnel (Hebrew: נִקְבַּת הַשִּׁלֹחַ, romanized: Nikbat HaShiloaḥ), also known as Hezekiah's Tunnel (תעלת חזקיהו, Teʿalát Ḥizkiyáhu), is a water tunnel that was carved within the City of David in ancient times, now located in the neighborhood of Silwan in East Jerusalem, Palestine. Its popular name is due to the most common hypothesis that it dates from the reign of Hezekiah of Judah, late 8th and early 7th century BC, and corresponds to the "conduit" mentioned in 2 Kings 20 in the Hebrew Bible. According to the Bible, King Hezekiah prepared Jerusalem for an impending siege by the Neo-Assyrian Empire, by "blocking the source of the waters of the upper Gihon, and leading them straight down on the west to the City of David" (2 Chronicles 32:30). By diverting the waters of the Gihon, he prevented the enemy forces under Sennacherib from gaining access to water. An older water system, sometimes called the Siloam Channel, partly fulfilled a similar purpose and dates back to the Canaanites (Bronze Age).

The idea of dating the tunnel to Hezekiah's period was derived from the Biblical text that describes construction of a water tunnel in his time. Scientific support for this, however, came from radiocarbon dates of organic matter contained in the original plastering as well as radiometry (uranium-thorium dating of speleothems). The dates were challenged in 2011 by new excavations that suggested an earlier origin in the late 9th or early 8th century BC.

The tunnel leads from the Gihon Spring to the Pool of Siloam. If indeed built under Hezekiah, it dates to a time when Jerusalem was preparing for an impending siege by the Assyrians, led by Sennacherib. Since the Gihon Spring was already protected by a massive tower and was included in the city's defensive wall system, Jerusalem seems to have been supplied with enough water in case of siege even without this tunnel. According to Aharon Horovitz, director of the Megalim Institute, the tunnel can be interpreted as an additional aqueduct designed for keeping the entire outflow of the spring inside the walled area, which included the downstream Pool of Siloam, with the specific purpose of withholding water from any besieging forces. Both the spring itself, and the pool at the end of the tunnel, would have been used by the inhabitants as water sources. Troops positioned outside the walls wouldn't have reached any of it, because even the overflow water released from the Pool of Siloam would have fully disappeared into a karstic system located right outside the southern tip of the city walls. In contrast to that, the previous water system did release all the water not used by the city population into the Kidron Valley to the east, where besieging troops could have taken advantage of it.

The curving tunnel is 583 yards (533 m; about 1/3 mile) long and by using the 12 inch (30 cm) altitude difference between its two ends, which corresponds to a 0.06 percent gradient, the engineers managed to convey the water from the spring to the pool.

According to the Siloam inscription, the tunnel was carved out of the living rock by two teams, one starting at each end of the tunnel and then meeting in the middle. The inscription is partly unreadable at present, and may originally have conveyed more information than this. It is clear from the tunnel itself that several directional errors were made during its construction. Recent scholarship has discredited the idea that the tunnel may have been formed by substantially widening a pre-existing natural karst. How the Israelite engineers dealt with the difficult feat of making two teams digging from opposite ends meet far underground is still not fully understood, but some suggest that the two teams were directed from above by sound signals generated by hammering on the solid rock through which the tunnelers were digging.

== Discovery and interpretation ==
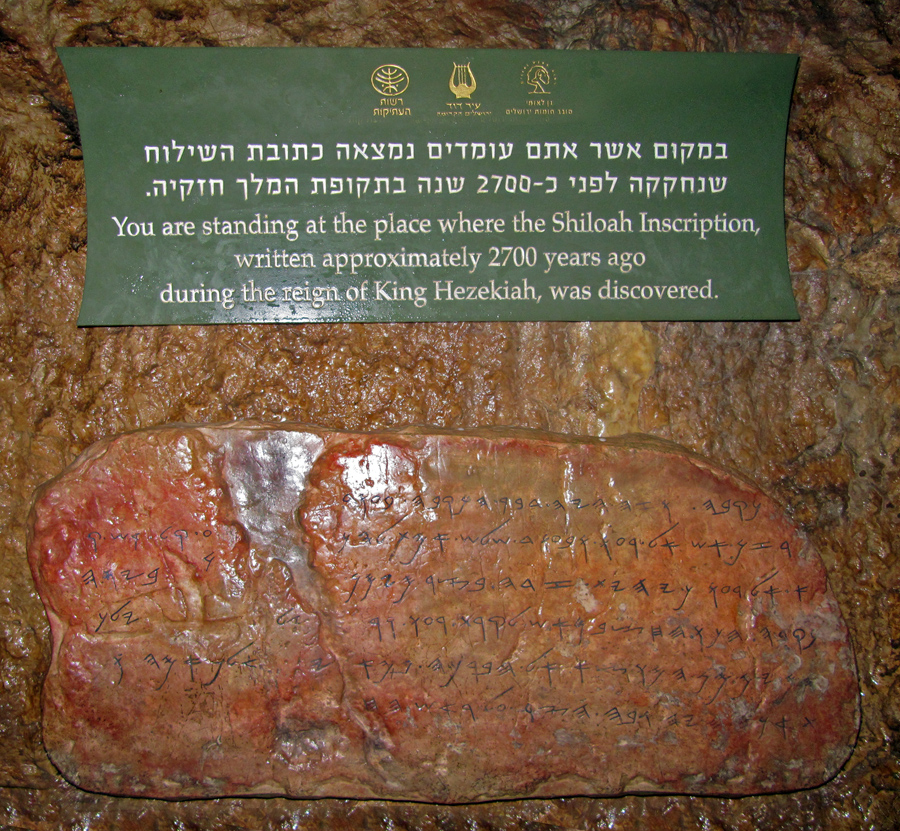
A copy of the Siloam inscription in its original location inside Hezekiah's Tunnel, 2010

The tunnel was first described in modern times by Franciscus Quaresmius in 1625. It was later explored in 1838 by the American biblical scholar Edward Robinson, and in 1865 by Charles Warren.

Neither Quaresmius nor Robinson identified the tunnel with Hezekiah, but in 1871 Warren suggested that the Pool of Siloam may have been "dug by King Hezekiah" and in 1884 following the discovery of the Siloam inscription wrote that: "The inscription thus appears to belong to the later period of the Hebrew monarchy, and may very well be considered to agree with the Biblical account of Hezekiah's preparations for Sennacherib's siege."

== Function and origin ==
The ancient city of Jerusalem, being on a mountain, is naturally defensible from almost all sides, but suffers from the drawback that its major source of fresh water, the Gihon Spring, is on the side of the cliff overlooking the Kidron Valley. This presented a major military weakness, as the city walls, if high enough to be defensible, must necessarily leave the Gihon spring outside, leaving the city without a fresh water supply in case of siege.

This weakness was removed by the Canaanites, who built a very strongly fortified tower around the spring and connected it to the city walls on the slope by an additional wall, which carried a well-protected corridor. A Canaanite tunnel already collected the spring water since ca. 1800 BC and led it southwards through the bedrock. It released the water onto the fields in the Kidron Valley through several openings, and ended in an open reservoir. While allowing for important farming, this arrangement also made water available to besieging troops outside the city walls.

The Bible says that King Hezekiah (c. 8th century BC), fearful that the Assyrians would lay siege to the city, blocked the spring's water outside the city and diverted it through a channel into the then Pool of Siloam. Since 1997, it is now known that the earlier Warren's shaft system had already heavily fortified the Gihon Spring. Warren's shaft is not an aqueduct, and requires those desiring water to travel up and down it themselves—an arrangement that Hezekiah seemingly must have considered inadequate.

In 1899, an ancient channel, also leading from the Gihon Spring halfway to the Siloam Pool area, but by a more direct route, was found. This channel is now known as the Middle Bronze Age channel, on account of its estimated age. Ronny Reich determined that it was constructed around 1800 BC, in the Middle Bronze Age, and thus that the spring's water had already been diverted many centuries before Hezekiah. As originally constructed, it is understood as a 20 feet deep ditch in the ground, covered over by large rock slabs, which were then hidden in the foliage. It is narrower than the tunnel, but can still be walked by a human for most of its length. In addition to the (3 ft high) exit near the Siloam pool, the channel has several small outlets that watered the gardens facing the Kidron Valley.

Similar to the qanats of ancient Persia, the canal or culvert, carved into the rock, led from a main water source, and was meant to channel the current to a lower place where water was needed for agricultural purposes. The well-like vertical shaft (Warren's Shaft), connected by a gently sloping tunnel, is thought to have provided ventilation, light and access to the underground water channel for construction and maintenance. At its outlet, a network of dams, gates and channels is used to distribute the water.

== Biblical interpretation ==
The Bible verses relating to a tunnel in Hezekiah's time are these:

"As for the other events of Hezekiah’s reign, all his achievements and how he made the pool and the tunnel by which he brought water into the city, are they not written in the book of the annals of the kings of Judah?" (2 Kings 20:20)

"When Hezekiah saw that Sennacherib had come and that he intended to wage war against Jerusalem, he consulted with his officials and military staff about blocking off the water from the springs outside the city, and they helped him. They gathered a large group of people who blocked all the springs and the stream that flowed through the land. 'Why should the kings of Assyria come and find plenty of water?' they said." (2 Chronicles 32:2–4)

"It was Hezekiah who blocked the upper outlet of the Gihon spring and channeled the water down to the west side of the City of David. He succeeded in everything he undertook." (2 Chronicles 32:30)

"You also saw the City of David, that it was great; And you gathered together the waters of the lower pool. You also made a reservoir between the two walls for the water of the old pool. But you did not look to its Maker, Nor did you have respect for him who fashioned it long ago." (Isaiah 22:11)

== Doubts over dating ==
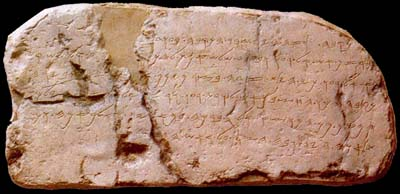
The Siloam inscription

Excavation work in the tunnel by Ronny Reich of the University of Haifa and Eli Shukron of the Israel Antiquities Authority has cast doubt over the attribution of the tunnel to the reign of Hezekiah. They believe the evidence points to a date several decades earlier, in the last part of the 9th century or early part of the 8th century BC. They note that the biblical passage connecting Hezekiah to the construction of waterworks doesn't specify a place in the city, and suggest it might refer to waterworks in the Mamilla area.

The revised dating is supported by De Groot and Fadida on the basis of pottery analysis.

== See also ==
- Fountain of the Virgin
- List of artifacts in biblical archaeology
- List of caves
- Qanat
- Siloam inscription
- Tunnel of Eupalinos, 6th century BC tunnel on Samos, Greece
- Turpan water system
- Warren's Shaft

== Gallery ==
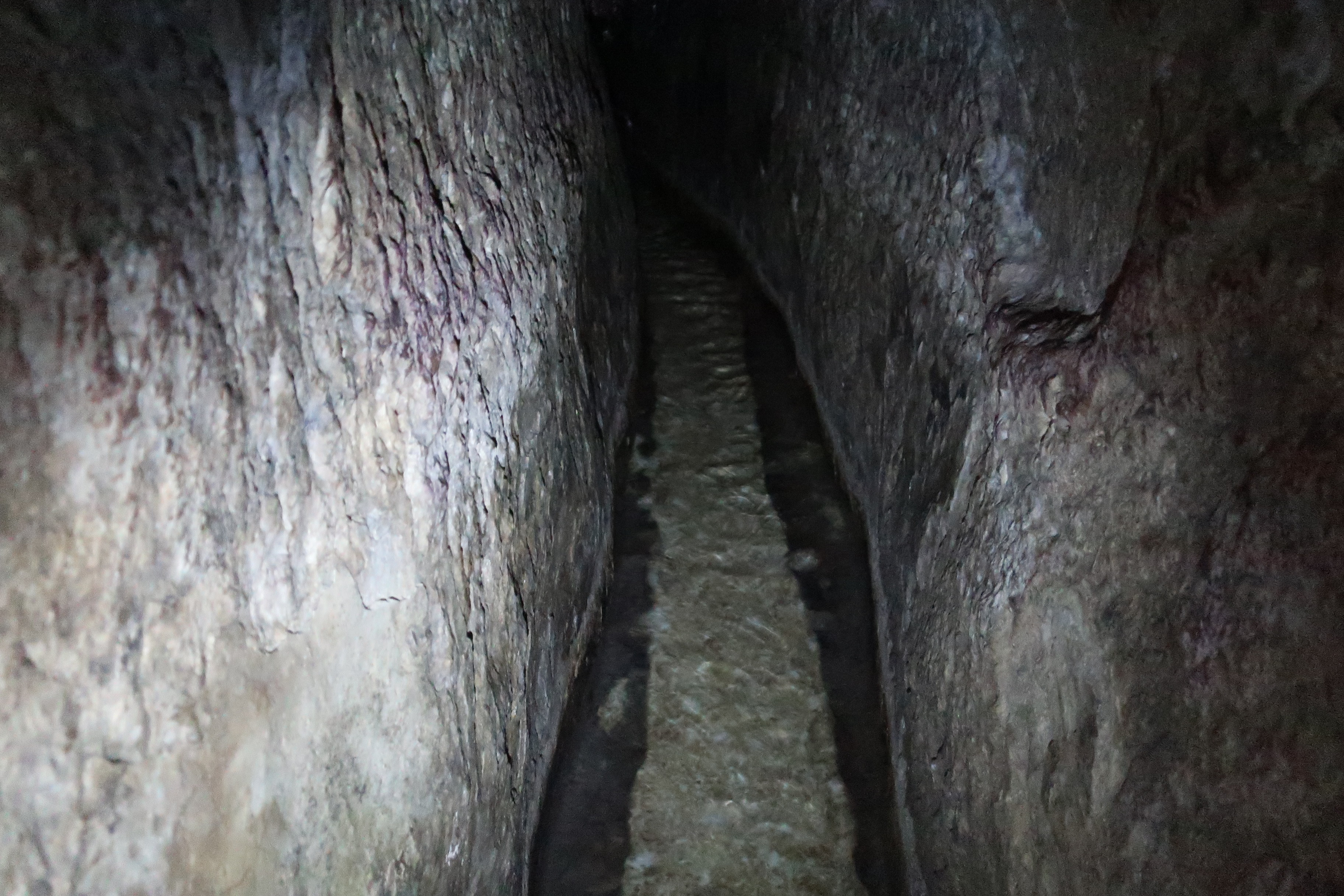
Hezekiah's Tunnel

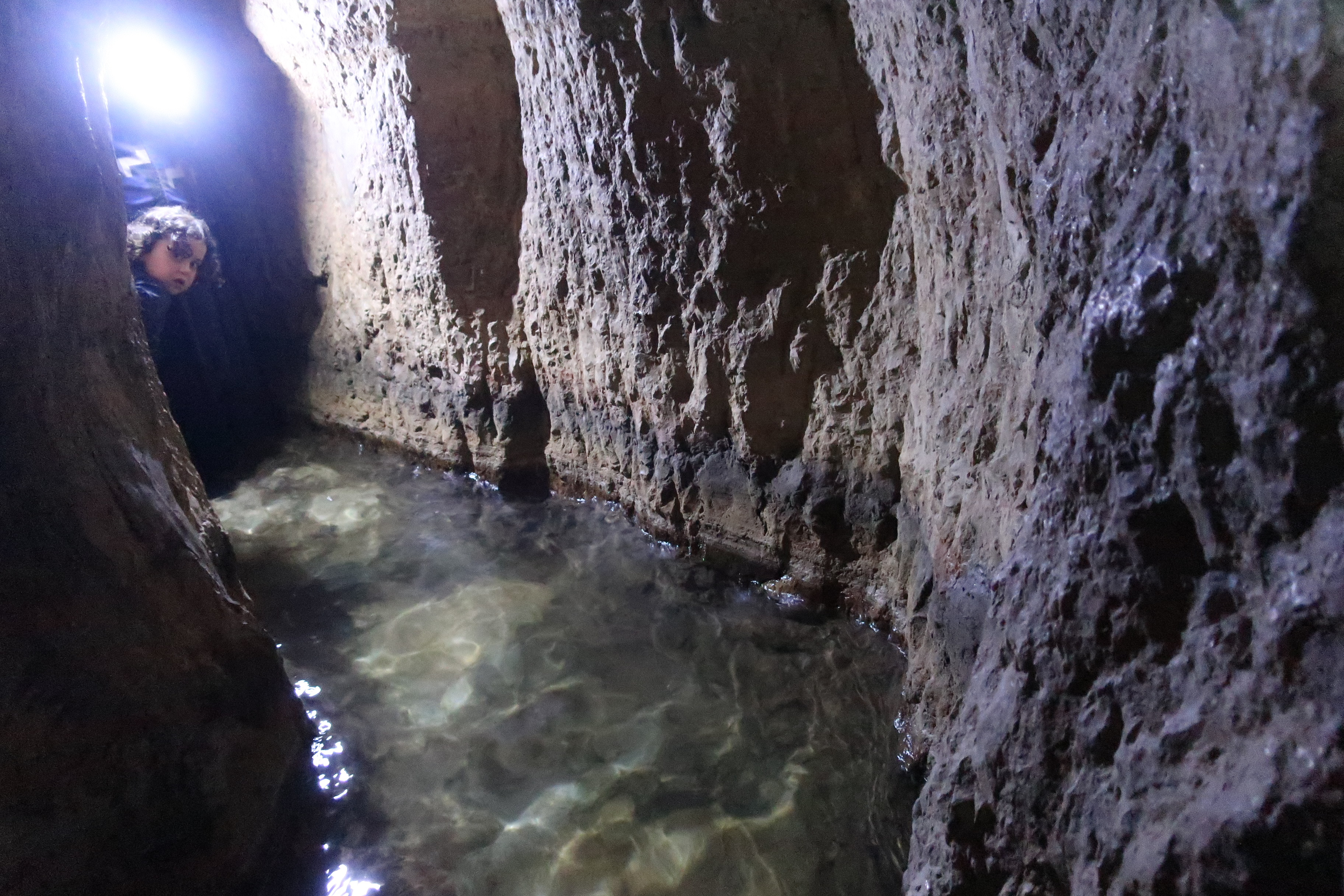
Wading through the waters of Hezekiah's Tunnel

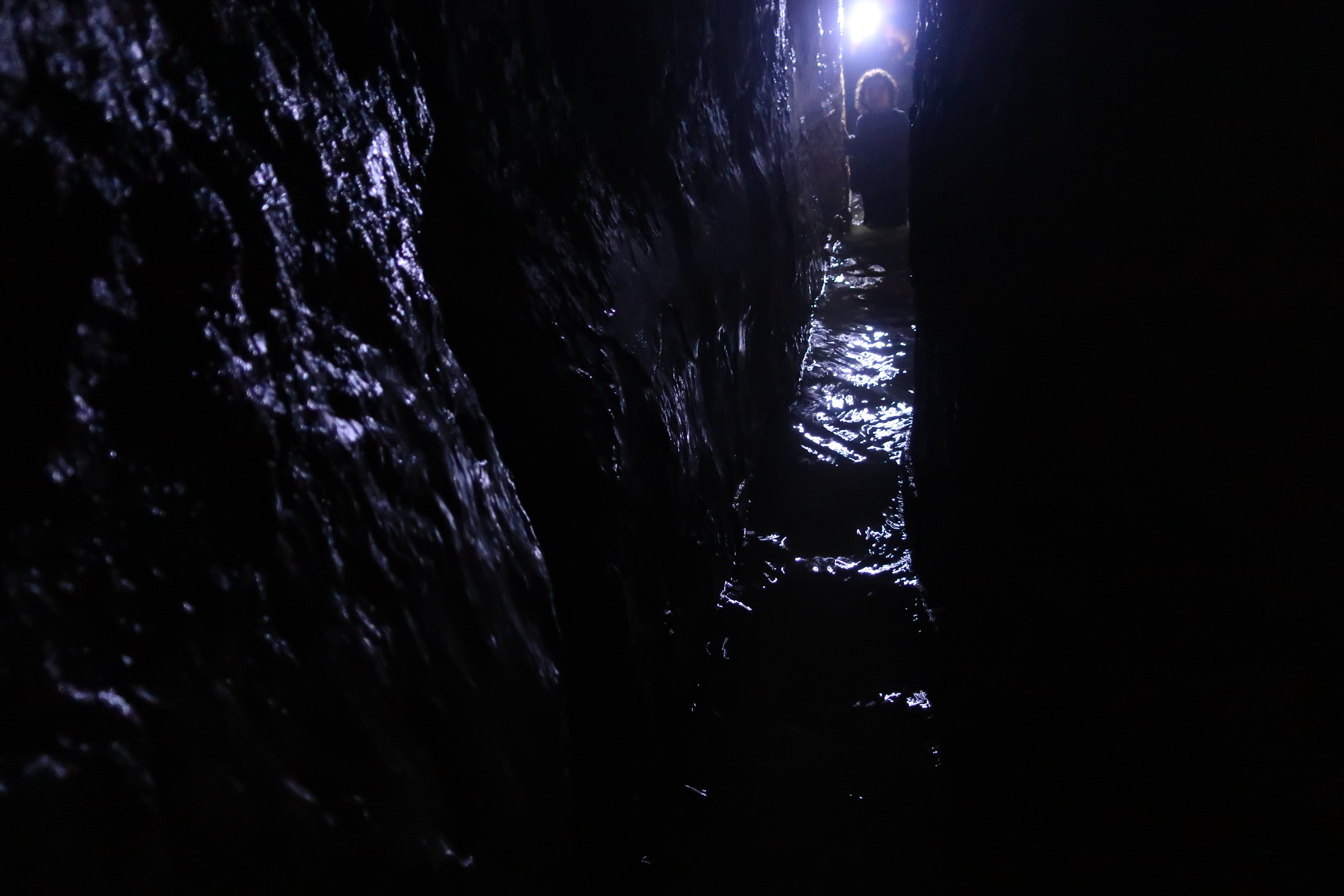
Exploring Hezekiah's Tunnel

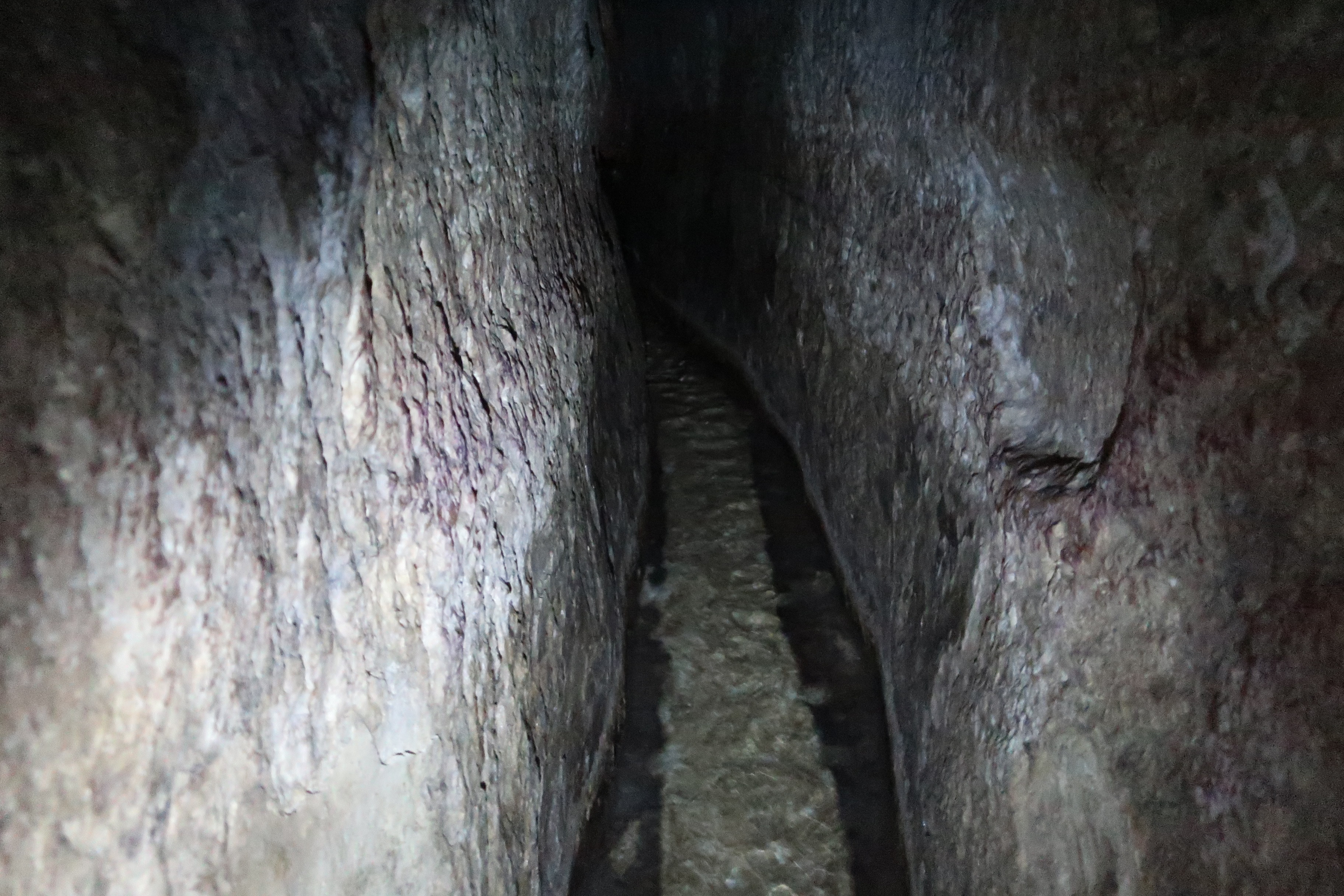
The conduit carved by King Hezekiah's men

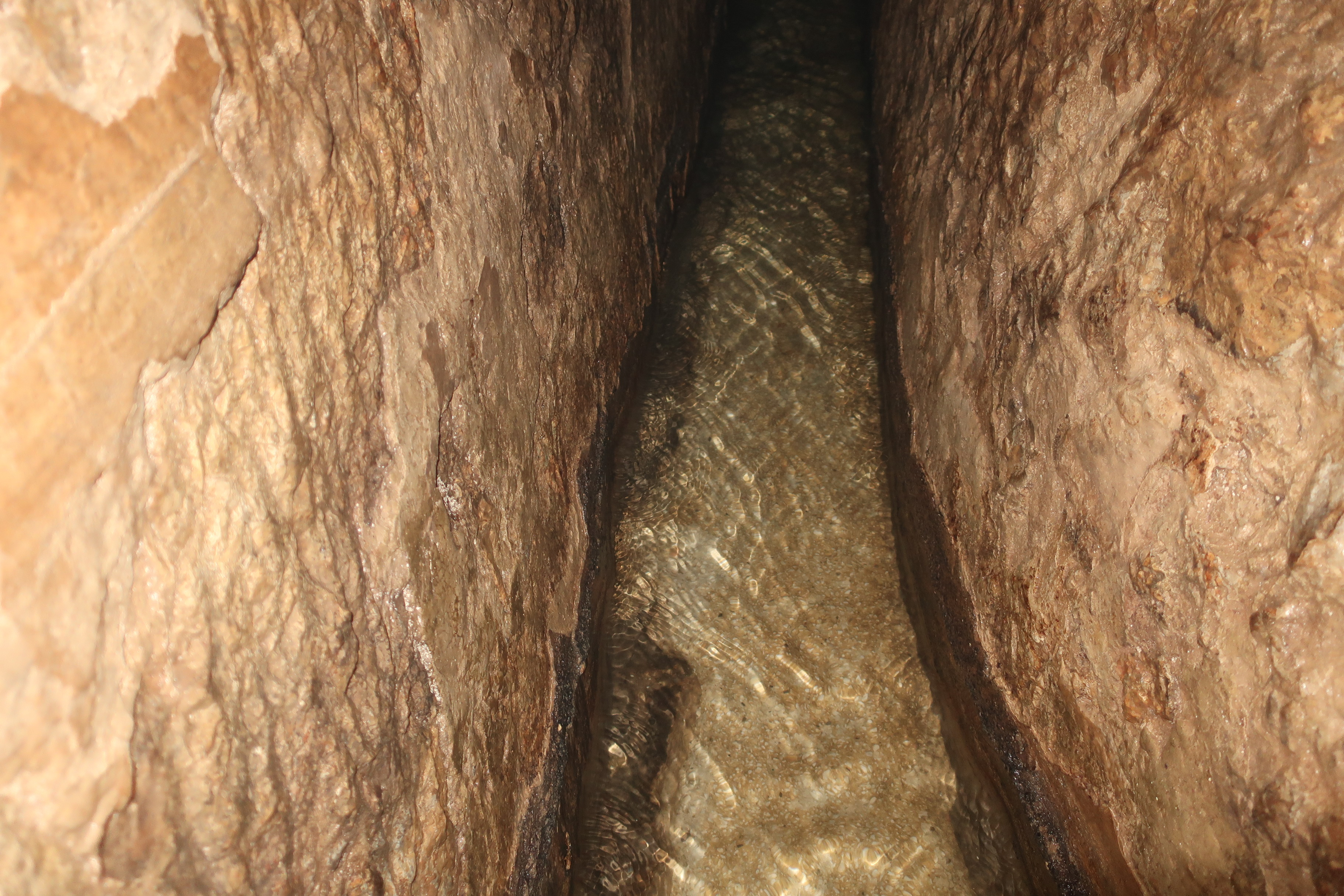
Water running the length of the conduit, carved through meleke limestone

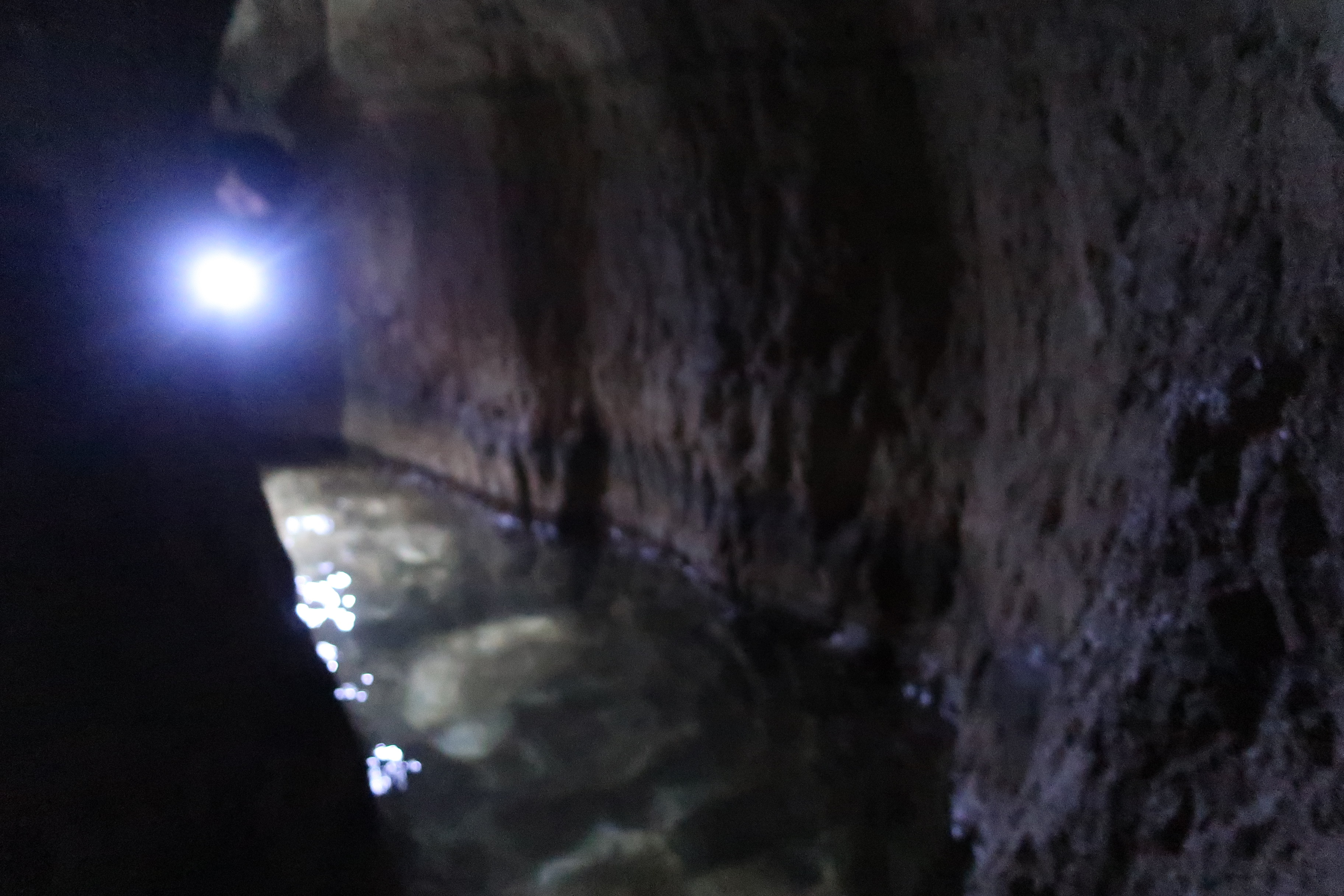
Flashlight (torch) lighten the way through Hezekiah's Tunnel

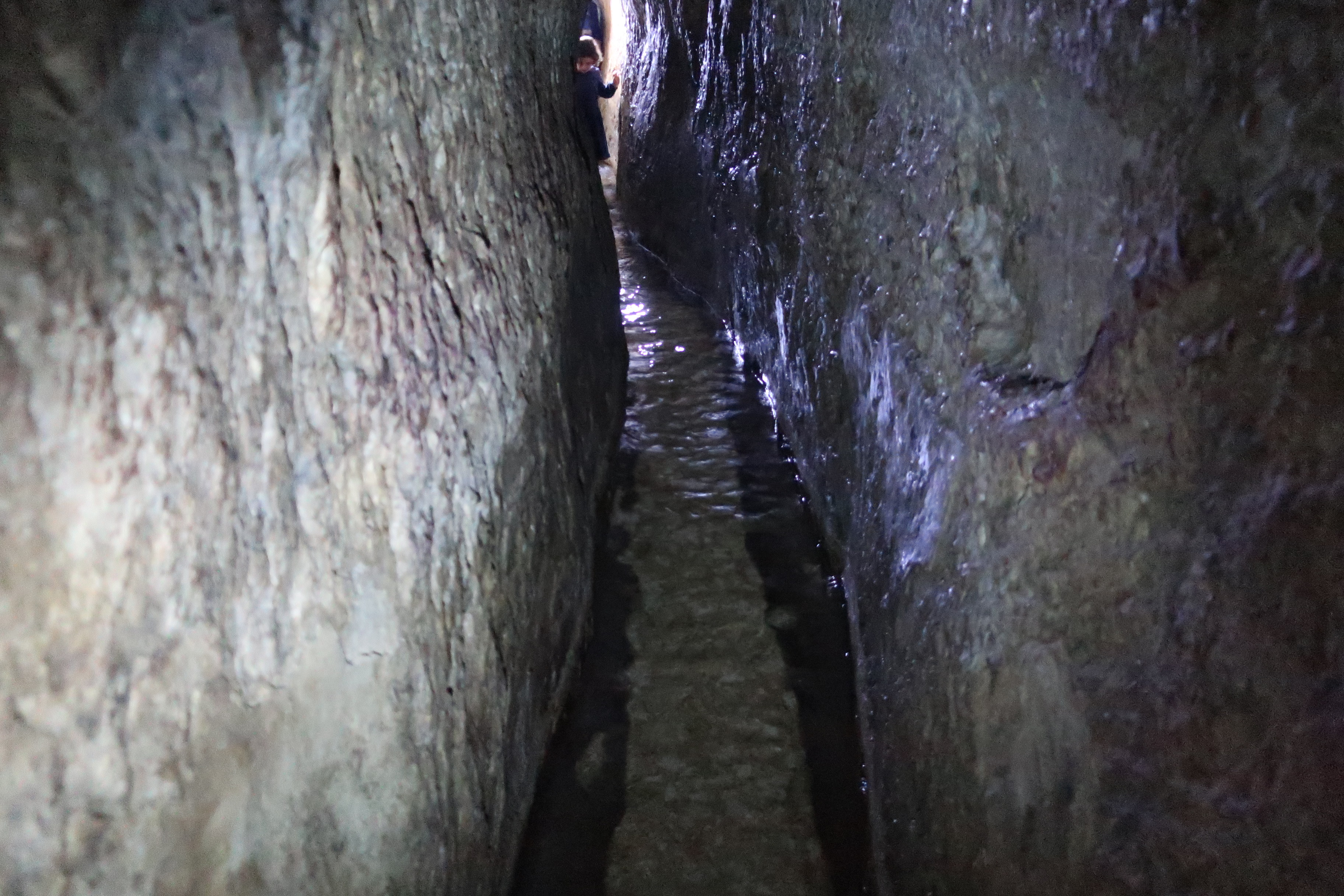
Walking through Hezekiah's tunnel

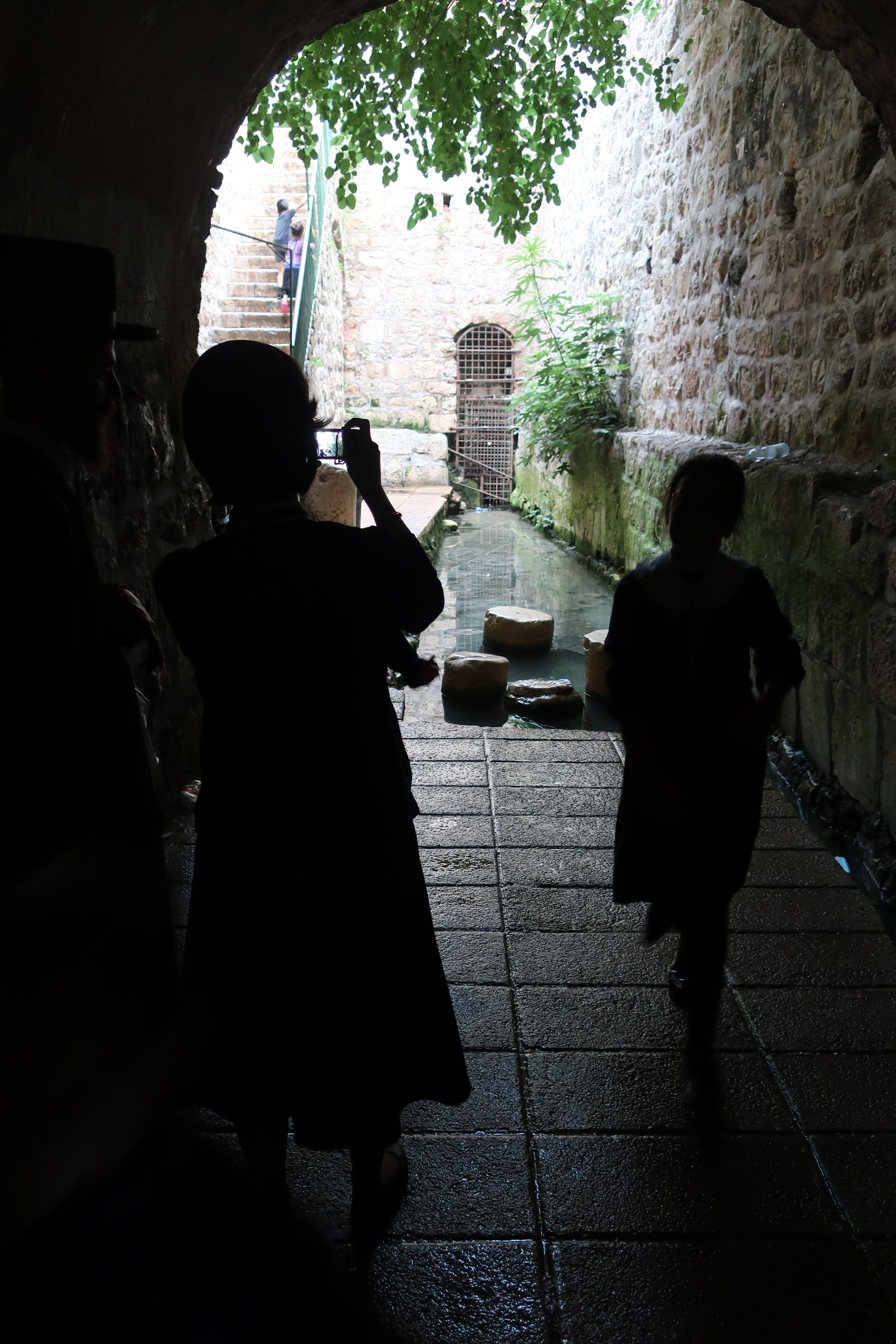
Siloam Pool as seen when exiting tunnel

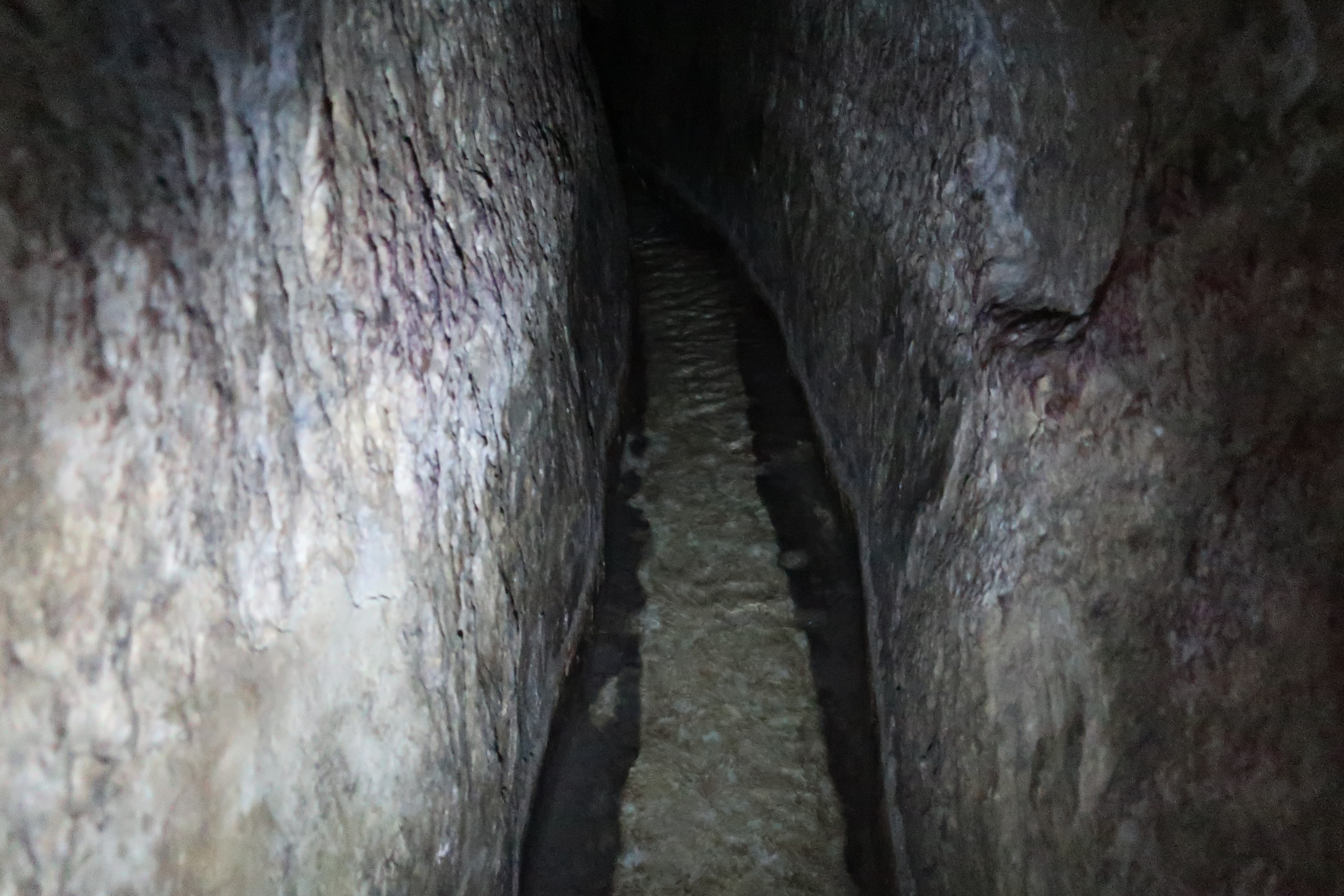
Conduit carved in rock to the divert the waters of the Gihon Spring

== Bibliography ==
- Brisco, Thomas C. (1998). Holman Bible Atlas. Nashville: Broadman & Holman Publishers. ISBN 1-55819-709-5.
- Frumkin, Amos; Shimron, Aryeh (2006). "Tunnel engineering in the Iron Age: Geoarchaeology of the Siloam Tunnel, Jerusalem". Journal of Archaeological Science. 33 (2): 227–237. Bibcode:2006JArSc..33..227F. doi:10.1016/j.jas.2005.07.018.
- David Ussishkin, The Original Length of the Siloam Tunnel in Jerusalem, Levant 8, 1976, pp. 82–95 doi:10.1179/lev.1976.8.1.82
- Rogerson, J., Davies, P. R., Was the Siloam Tunnel Built by Hezekiah?, Biblical Archaeologist 59, 1996, pp. 138–49.
- Rosenberg, S., The Siloam Tunnel Revisited, Tel Aviv 25, 1998, pp. 116–30.
- Frumkin, A., Shimron, A., and Rosenbaum, J., Radiometric Dating of the Siloam Tunnel, Nature 425, Jerusalem, 2003, pp. 169–71.
- Amihai Sneh, Ram Weinberger, Eyal Shalev, The Why, How, and When of the Siloam Tunnel Reevaluated, Bulletin of the American Schools of Oriental Research 359, August 2010, pp. 57–65
- Ronald S. Hendel, The Date of the Siloam Inscription: A Rejoinder to Rogerson and Davies, Biblical Archaeologist, 1996, vol.59
- Shlomo Guil A New Perspective on the Various Components of the Siloam Water System in Jerusalem.Zeitschrift des Deutschen Palastina-Vereins,133 (2017) 2.
