= Gihon Spring =

Water spring in Jerusalem

Coordinates: 31°46′23″N 35°14′11″E

- Fountain of the Virgin
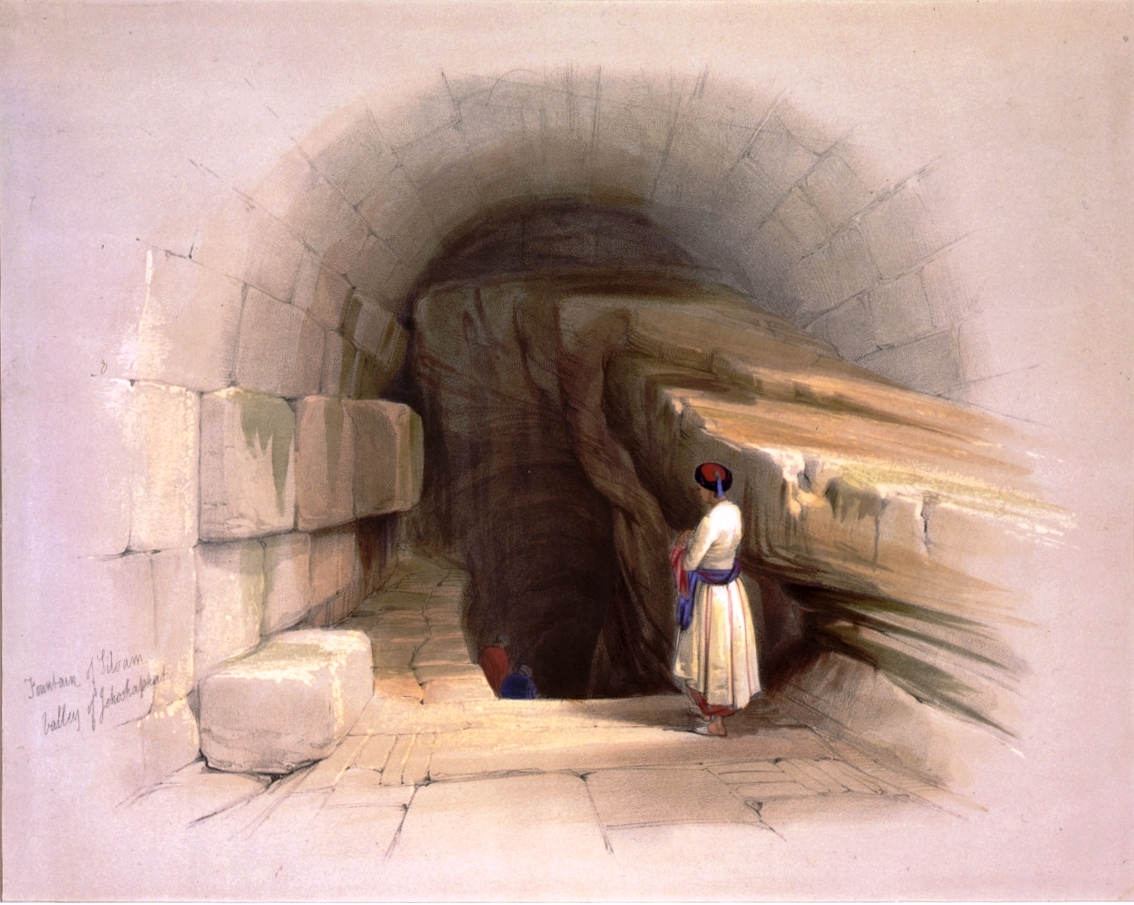
- Illustration of Gihon Spring ("Upper Fountain of Siloam") in David Roberts' The Holy Land, Syria, Idumea, Arabia, Egypt, and Nubia
- Interactive map of Gihon Spring
- Location: Jerusalem, Israel
- Eruption height: 636 m (2,087 ft)

Gihon Spring (Hebrew: מעיין הגיחון) or Fountain of the Virgin, also known as Saint Mary's Pool, is a spring in the Kidron Valley. It was the main source of water for the Pool of Siloam in Jebus and the later City of David, the original site of Jerusalem.

One of the world's major intermittent springs – and a reliable water source that made human settlement possible in ancient Jerusalem – the spring was not only used for drinking water, but also initially for irrigation of gardens in the adjacent Kidron Valley, which provided a food source for the ancient settlement.

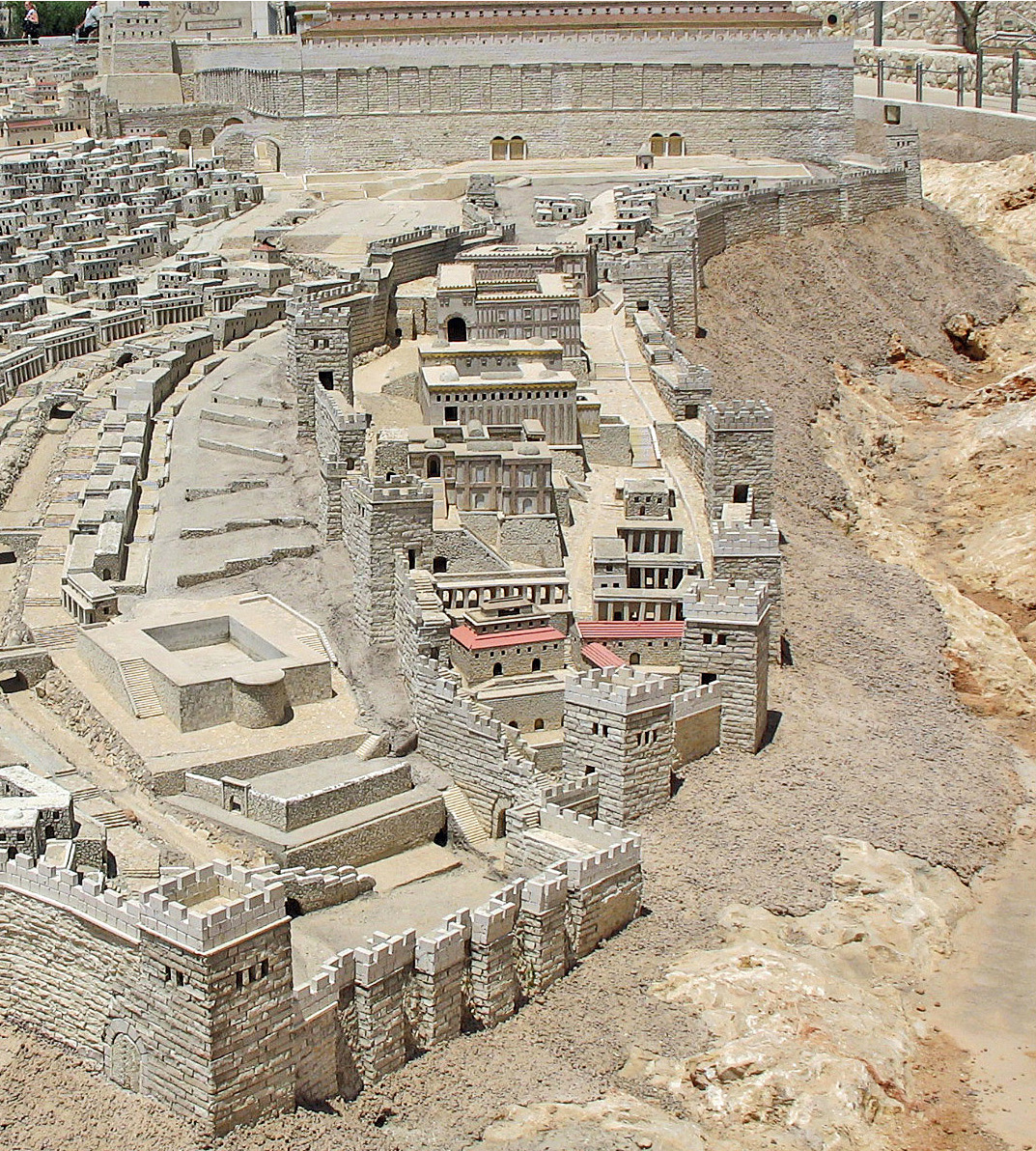
Model of historical City of David in the Israel Museum

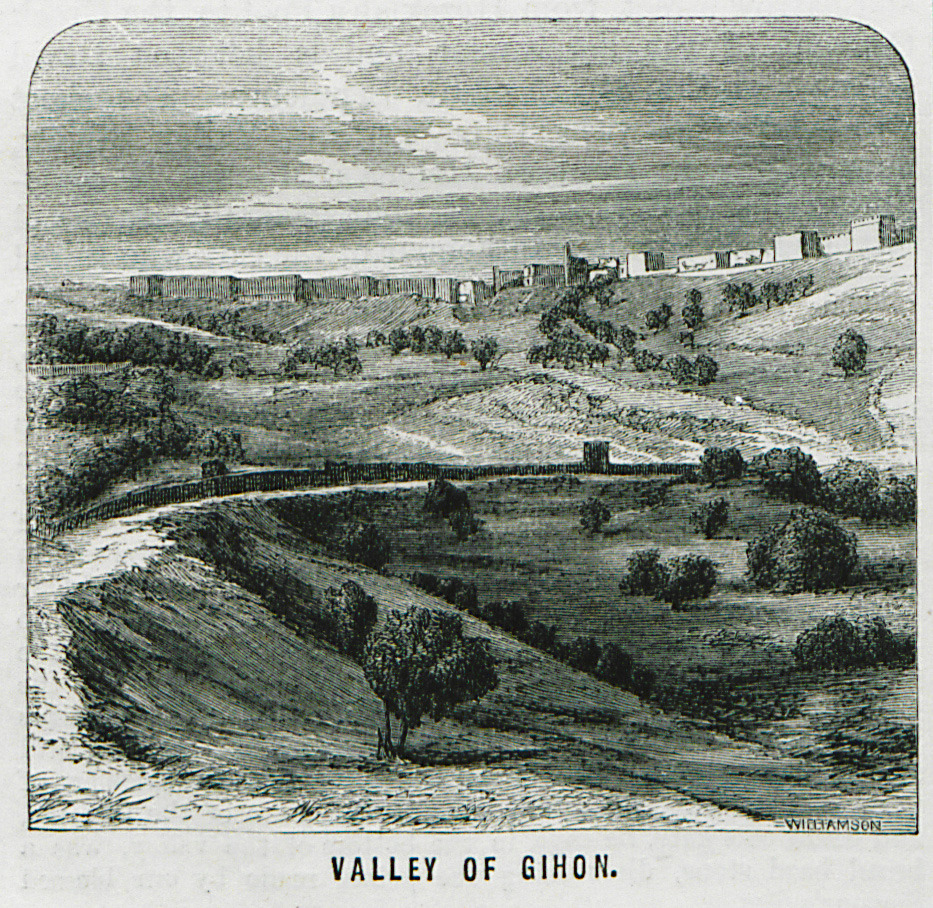
The Valley of Gihon. W. F. Ainsworth, 1870

The spring rises in a cave 20 feet by 7, and is located 586 yards (535 m) northwards of the Pool of Siloam. Being intermittent, it required the excavation of the Pool of Siloam, which stored the large amount of water needed for the town when the spring was not flowing. Before the water table declined due to modern overpumping, the spring used to flow three to five times a day in winter, twice daily in summer, and once daily in autumn. This peculiarity is accounted for by the supposition that the outlet from the reservoir is by a passage in the form of a siphon. It has the largest output of water in the area – 600,000 cubic meters of water a year (compared to 125,000 cubic meters for the Lifta spring in West Jerusalem).

The spring is under the control of the Israeli organization Ir David Foundation ("El'ad"); it is sometimes used by Jewish men as a sort of ritual bath (mikvah).

== Etymology ==
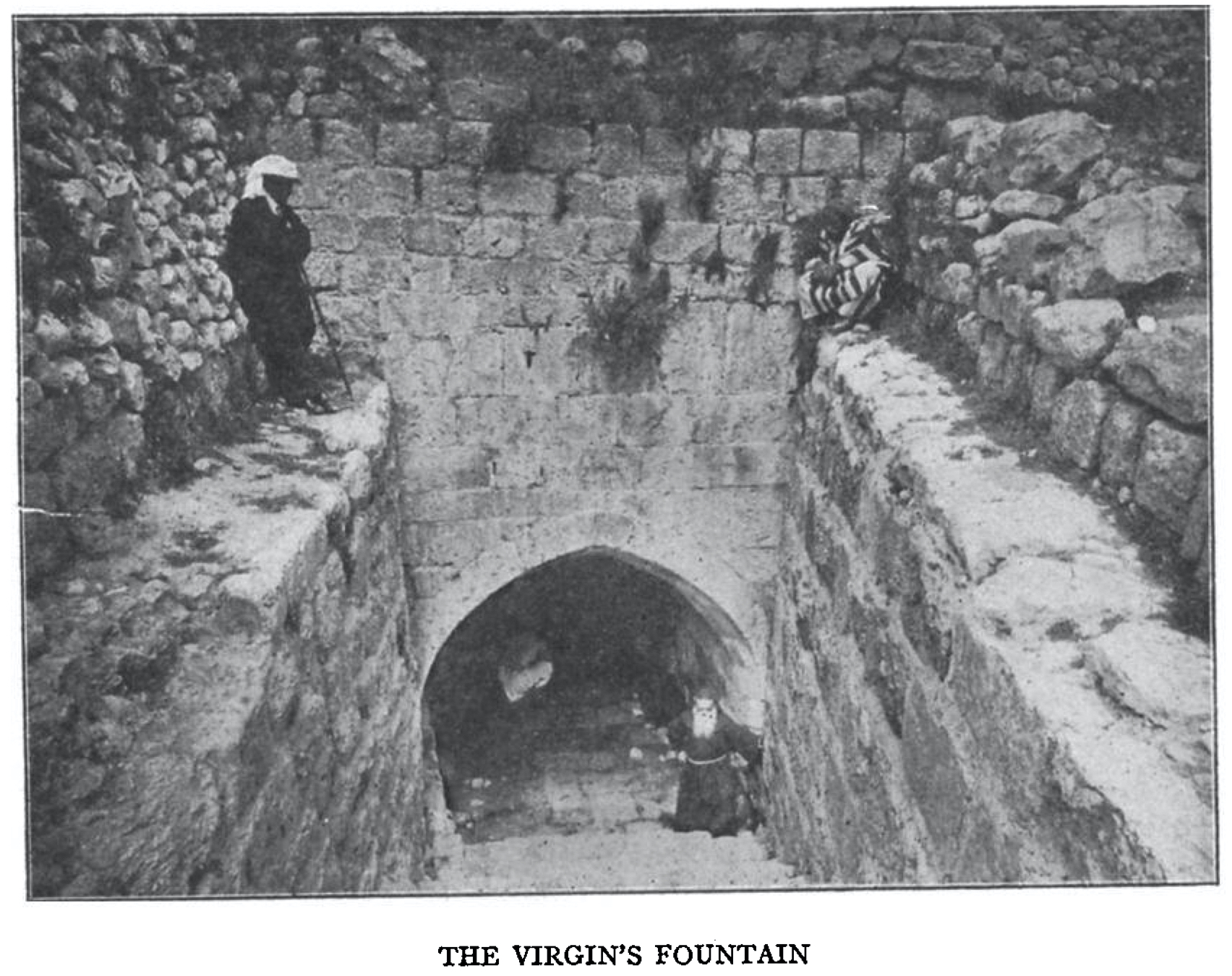
Virgin's Fountain in 1907

Gihon is also the name of one of the four rivers coming from Eden (Genesis 2:13). The name Gihon is thought to derive from the Hebrew Giha which means "gushing forth". The city of Jerusalem's modern waterworks corporation, Hagihon ('The Gihon'), is named after the spring.

The name Fountain of the Virgin derives from legend that here Mary washed the swaddling clothes of Jesus.

== History ==
=== Bronze and Iron Age water systems ===
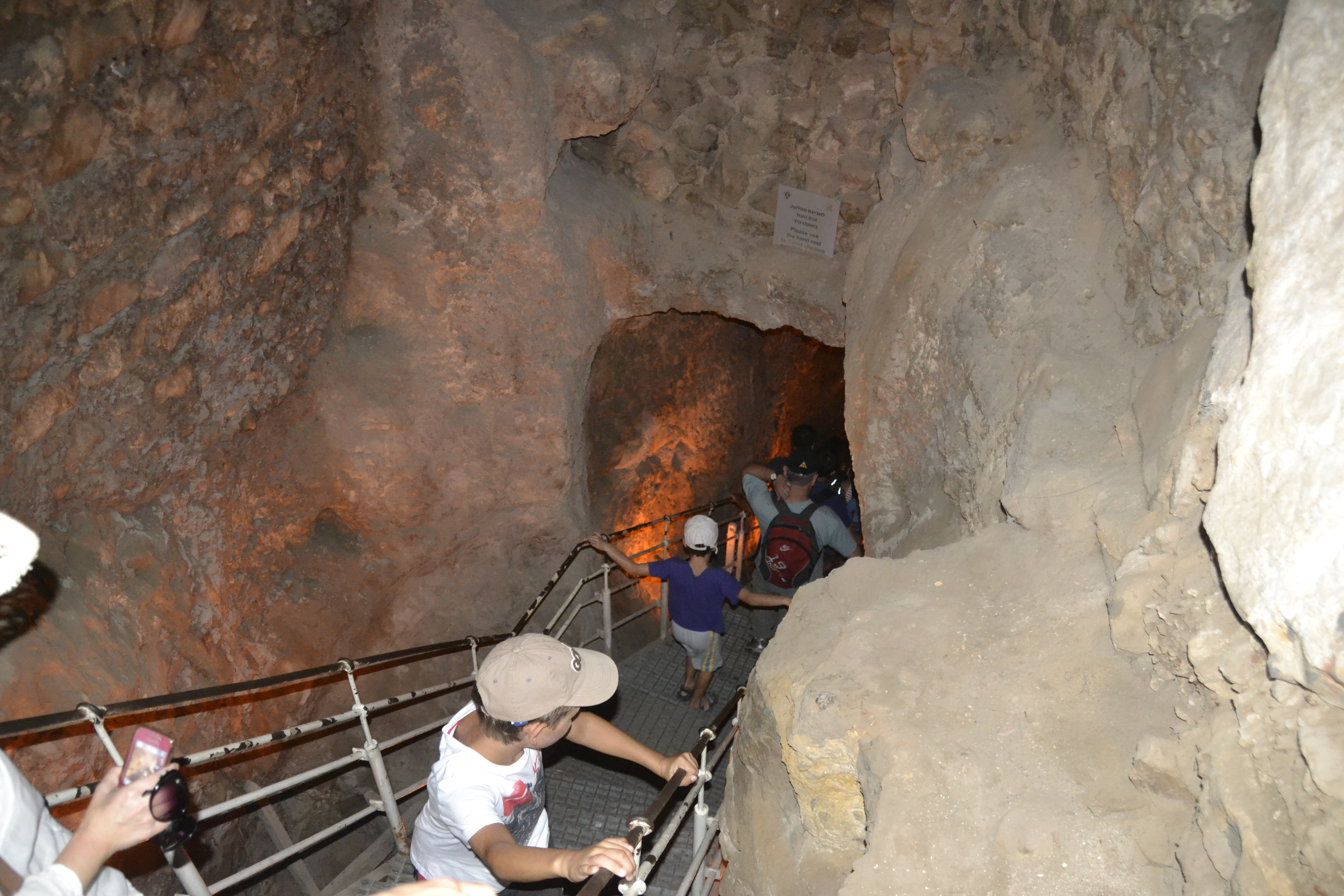
Descent to spring

Three main water systems allowed water to be brought from the spring under a protective cover, including natural, masonry-built, and rock-cut structures:

- The Middle Bronze Age Siloam Channel – a fairly straight channel dating from the Middle Bronze Age, cut 20 feet into the ground, and then covered with slabs (which themselves were then hidden by foliage). This led from the spring to the oldest, or Upper Pool of Siloam, and can be defined as an aqueduct.
- The Bronze Age Warren's Shaft system – a system of tunnels, dating from slightly later than the Middle Bronze Age channel, leading from the Well Gate at the top of Ophel above Gihon, down to the spring. This passage was for people to collect water from the spring. The actual, natural vertical "Warren's Shaft", played no role in the water system.
- The Iron Age Siloam Tunnel – a winding tunnel carved into the rock, leading from the spring to the Pool of Siloam. Dating from the time of Hezekiah or earlier, it was an aqueduct that effectively replaced the Middle Bronze Age channel. The Siloam inscription was found carved into its wall.

=== 1948 ===
A day after the Israeli Declaration of Independence, on 15 May 1948, as part of a biological warfare strategy developed for the 1948 Arab–Israeli War, Israeli forces under Yigael Yadin are alleged to have poisoned either the spring or the neighbouring Pool of Siloam with typhus and diphtheria bacteria in Operation Cast Thy Bread. The precise point is unknown, the operation's code name speaks only of dosing waters in the Shelomo ha-Melekh (King Solomon) area of Jerusalem. A second such poisoning allegedly occurred sometime before 26 May.

== Archaeology ==
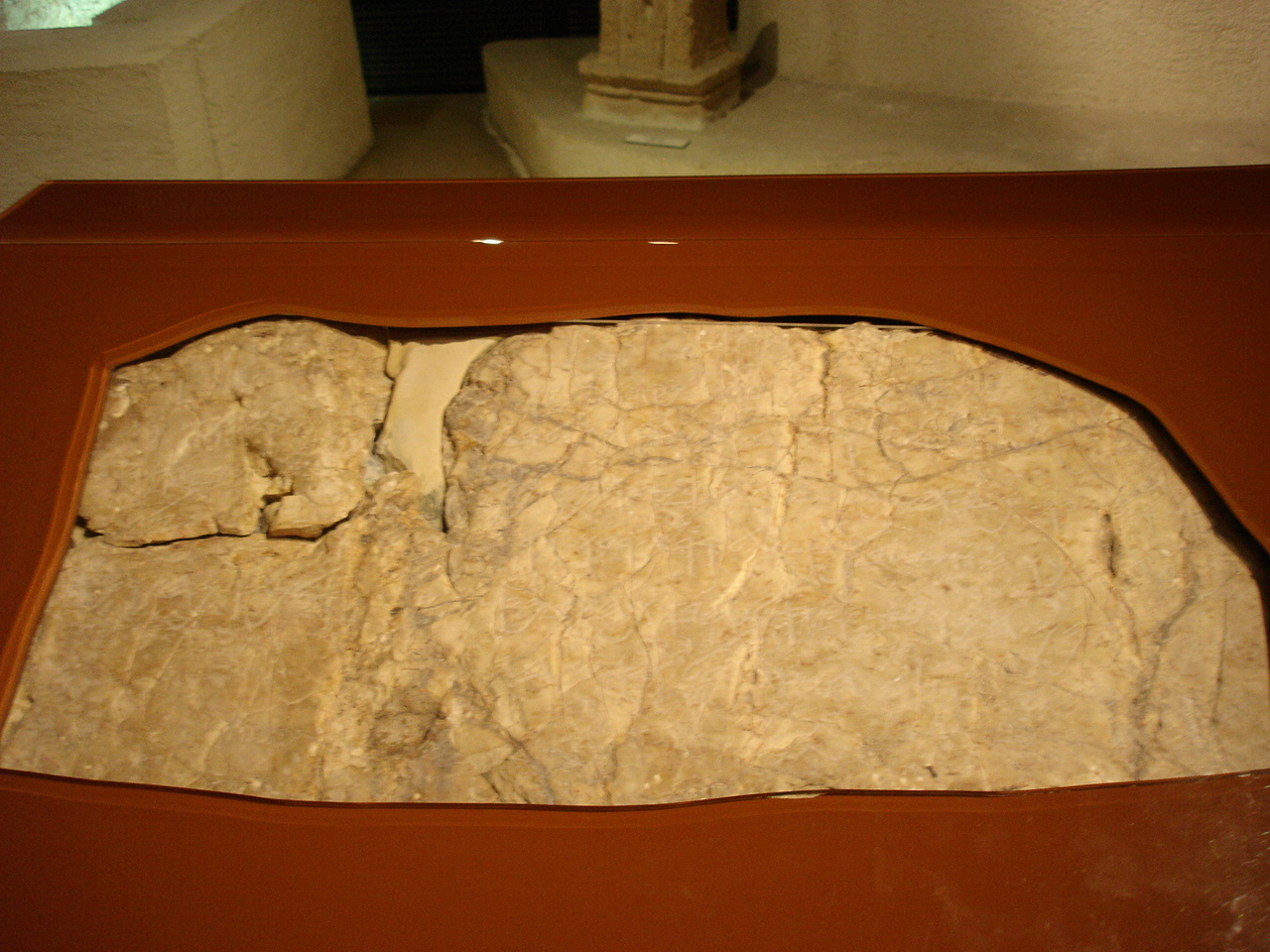
Siloam inscription, discovered in 1880

In the mid-19th century, James Turner Barclay attempted to explore a subterranean passageway leading from the "Virgin's Fount" (Gihon Spring) and which channel led, in his view, "to a point within a short distance from the Mugrabin Gate, where it turned abruptly to the west," and where he could proceed no further because of it being blocked by stones and by fallen debris. According to his hypothesis, the channel was made "to discharge surplus water into the Ophel channel, in order that it might be reservoired in the Pool of Siloam." In 1997, while a visitor centre was being constructed, the spring was discovered to have been heavily fortified at dates then thought to be Middle Bronze Age, when archaeologists unexpectedly uncovered two monumental towers, one protecting the base of Warren's Shaft, and the other protecting the spring itself.

=== Dating ===
A 2017 study by the Weizmann Institute of Science has redated the constructions, reporting that "Scenarios for the construction of the spring fortification during Middle Bronze Age (MB) and Iron Age II are considered, based on the new ^{14}C data, yielding a series of dates, the latest of which falls in the terminal phases of the 9th century BCE, alongside previous excavation data." Israel Finkelstein has suggested that the tower could still be Bronze Age but restored in the Iron Age adding that "In any event, a late 9th century date should come as no surprise, as there are other indications for the growth of the city at that time – from the Temple Mount (in my opinion the original location of the mound of Jerusalem) to the south, in the direction of the Gihon spring". In a 2018 study however Ronny Reich defends the original Middle Bronze Age dating arguing the samples may have been embedded at a later date due to flooding, the specific section where the samples were sourced could be a later Iron age renovation not disproving the entire structure. He basis the early claim with its resembles of other Middle Bronze age fortifications.
