= Warren's Shaft =

Archaeological site in Israel

Coordinates: 31°46′23.12″N 35°14′9.86″E

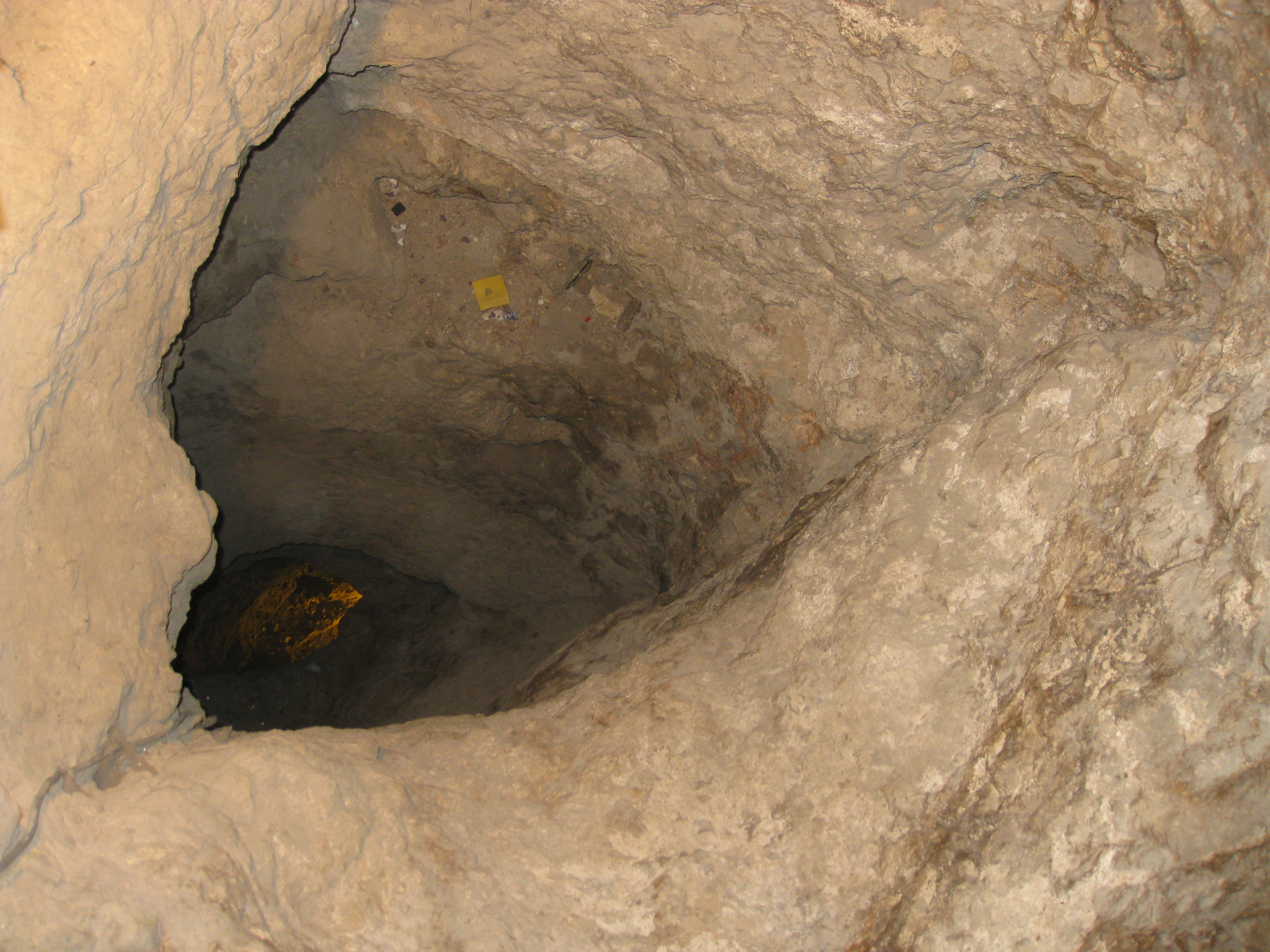
Warren's Shaft.

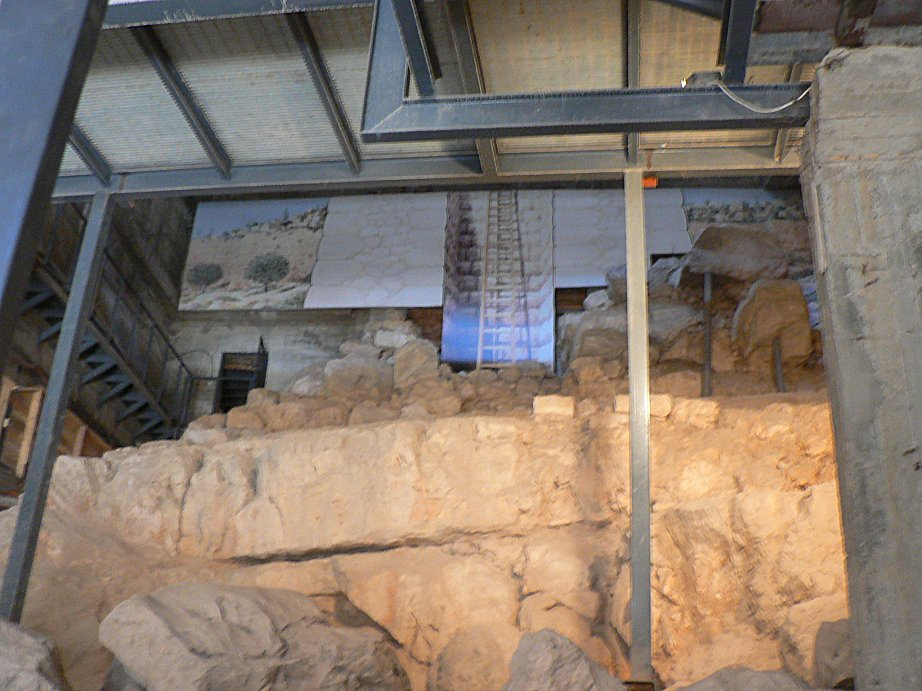
Warren's Shaft.

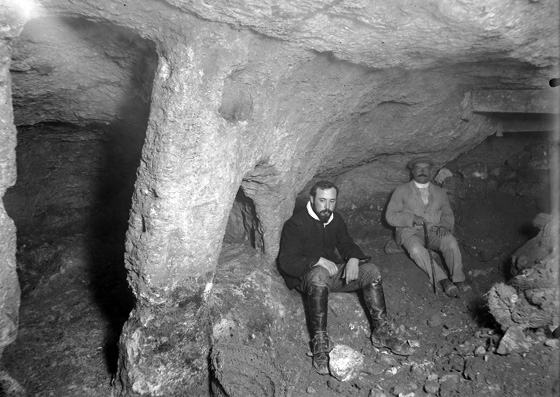
Valter Juvelius (left) around 1909–1911 in the Siloam tunnel.

Warren's Shaft is a vertical shaft next to the Gihon Spring, the main source of water of Bronze and Iron Age Jerusalem, discovered in 1867 by British engineer, archaeologist and military officer Charles Warren. The term is currently used in either a narrower or a wider sense:

- In the narrower, initial sense, Warren's Shaft is the almost vertical natural shaft leading down to a pool fed by the Gihon Spring.
- In the wider sense, as the Warren's Shaft system, it is the Bronze Age water system allowing protected access from the city to the Gihon Spring.

After the 19th-century discovery of the vertical natural shaft, it was thought to have been the centrepiece of the city's early water supply system, since it would have enabled the city's occupants to safely reach fresh water in times of siege. This view is still held by many archaeologists, though some believe the shaft was never used in the water system and that it was discovered by chance only during the Iron Age.

In 2005, archaeologists discovered a massively fortified passage connected to a tower above the Gihon Spring. These fortifications appear to have provided secure surface access to the spring from inside the Middle Bronze Age city wall. How these fortifications relate to Warren's Shaft and tunnel remains a matter for discussion.

== Discovery ==
The discovery was published by the Palestine Exploration Fund, in the form of a letter from Charles Warren on 12 December 1867. The letter ends: "The discovery of a shaft down to the water of the Virgin's Fount threw considerable light upon the object of the rock-cut canals about Jerusalem, as proving them as, had been conjectured by some, to have been for conducting away the refuse and blood from the temple."

== Biblical reference ==
The Old Testament (2 Samuel 5:8, 1 Chronicles 11:6) states that King David conquered Jerusalem from the Jebusites, after Joab had gained secret access to the walled town through a feature called in Hebrew the tsinnor. The accuracy of this story has been questioned by some historians. Some have speculated that the tsinnor is Warren's Shaft. The shaft was demonstrated to be traversable when Sergeant Birtles, a member of Warren's team, climbed up the shaft. The Hebrew word has a variety of meanings, so its interpretation as a "shaft" remains open to question.

Others have speculated that the tsinnor is the massive fortified passage near Gihon, built by the Canaanites as a protected access to their water supply, or that the tsinnor is one of the many subterranean tunnels around the Gihon Spring. Others think that it has nothing to do with water shafts at all but that it instead should be interpreted as "windpipe", referring to the throats of those who lived in the city. Most interpreters stick to the water shaft hypothesis, however.

== Overview ==
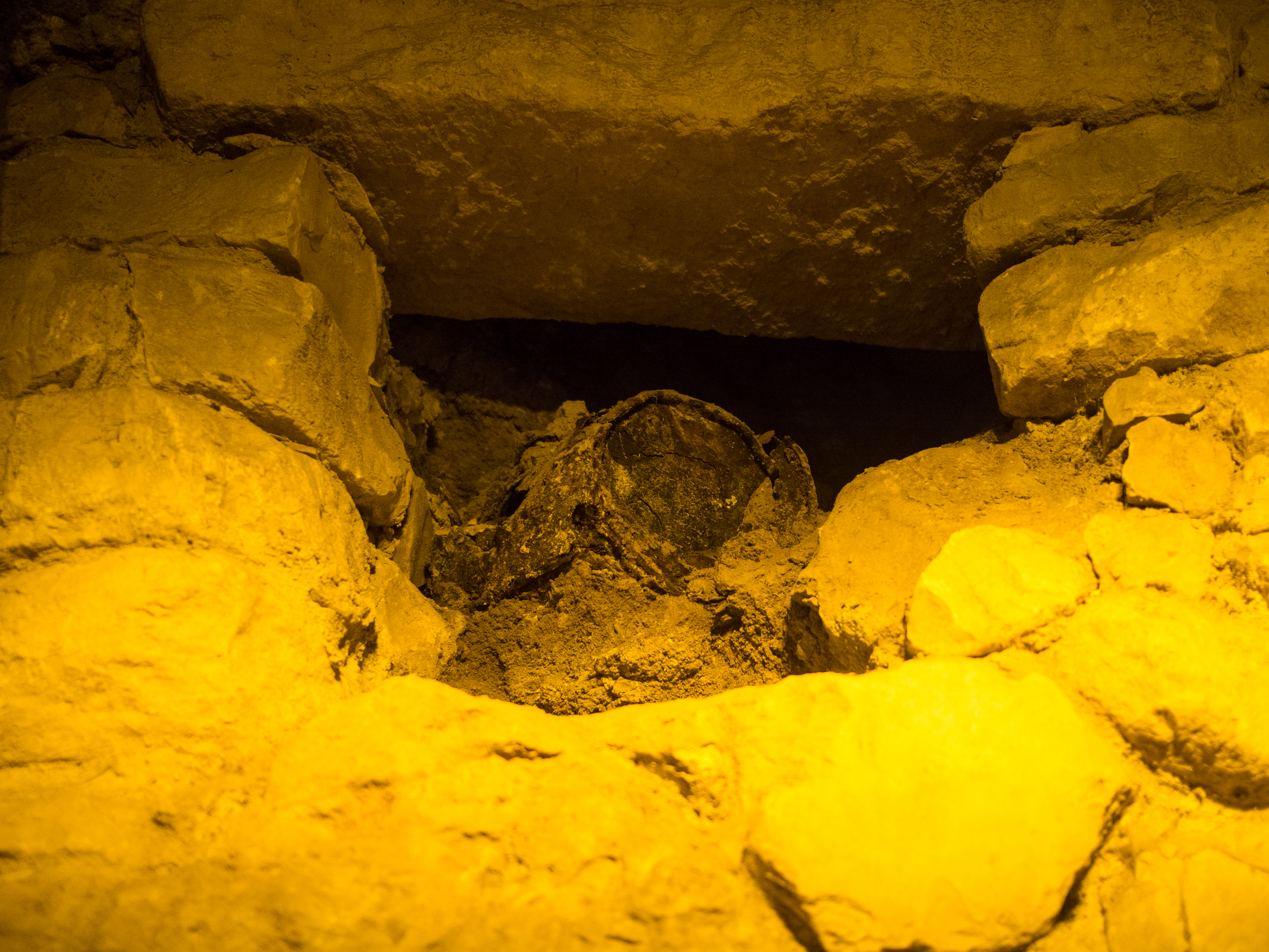
Warren's bucket in the City of David dig site

The wider meaning of the term includes four sections in sequence:

- a stepped tunnel
- a horizontal but curved tunnel
- a 13-metres-high vertical shaft (Warren's Shaft proper)
- a feeding tunnel (Tunnel VI)

=== Shaft ===
It is generally believed that the 13-metres-high shaft is a natural karst "chimney". Water pools around the base of the shaft, which extends down to the water table. Opinion remains divided as to whether the shaft could have been used to raise water up to the tunnel. Opinion is divided on when the shaft was discovered, with some thinking that happened as early as the Middle Bronze Age, and others thinking it happened no earlier than the 8th century BCE.

In design, Warren's Shaft connects to an underground channel carved from the rock, known as Hezekiah's Tunnel, perhaps suggesting that its function was similar to the ancient qanat used to transport water underground by digging out a horizontal underground gallery that conveys water from aquifers in pre-mountainous alluvial fans to lower elevation farmlands. If so, the vertical shaft connecting the channel was designed to permit access to the canal or culvert for both construction and maintenance, as well as to afford light and ventilation.

=== Water system tunnels ===
The hard dolomite rock around the Gihon Spring pool is honeycombed with natural karst fissures through which groundwater percolates. At various times, some of these fissures were utilised as aids in the digging of tunnels and channels to control the flow of subsurface water, and especially at the Gihon Spring. Many different opinions have been expressed on the dating, history and function of these tunnels since they were first explored in the 19th and early 20th centuries.

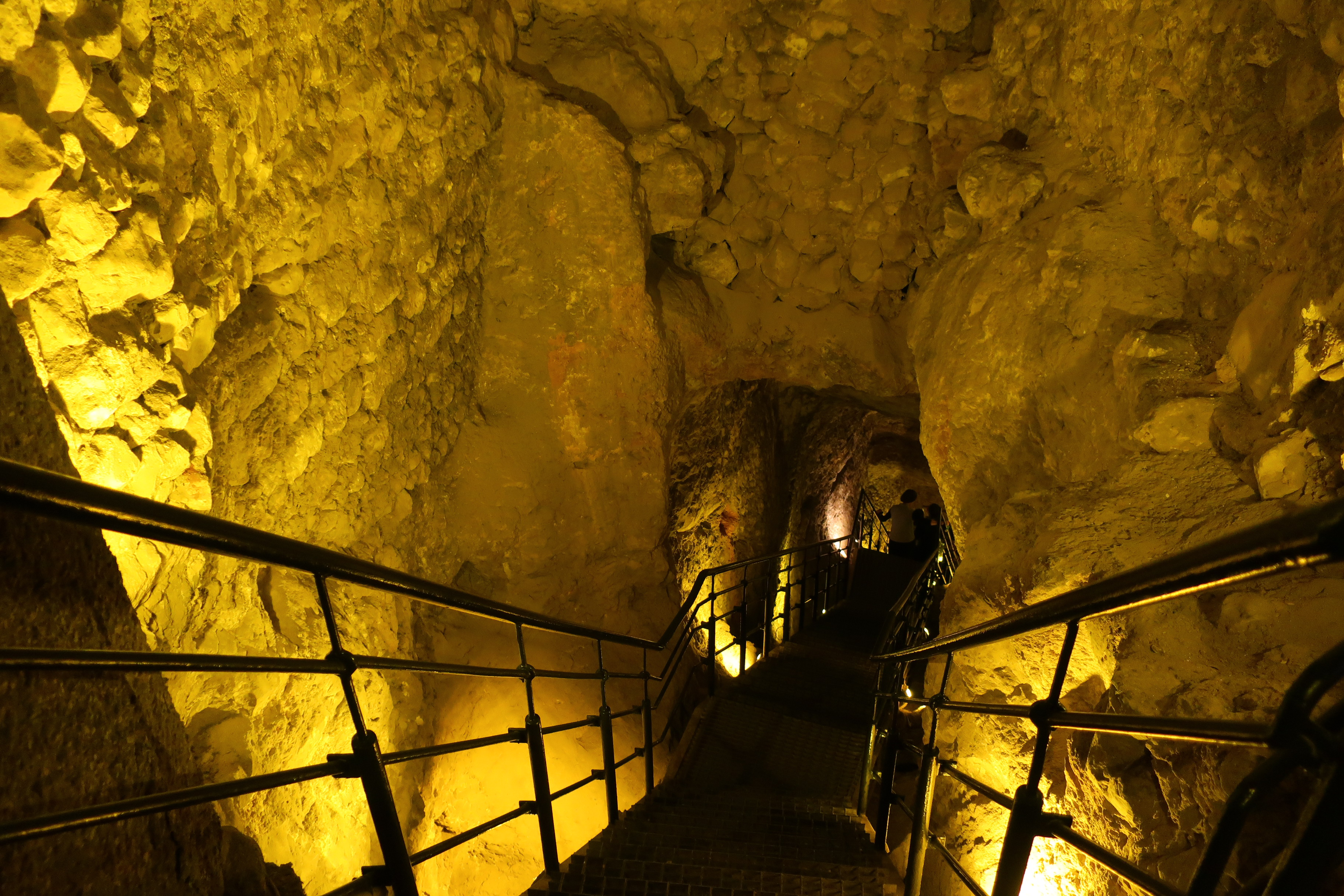
Today's modern descent into Warren's shaft in the City of David

Apart from the Gihon Spring pool, nine main components of the water system have been identified:

- Channel I. This begins at the Gihon Pool and heads down into the Kidron Valley.
- Channel II. This is a long channel dug from the surface, beginning at the Gihon Pool and heading south along the lower slope of the City of David. It was originally used to water fields on the Kidron slope. Its southern third is entirely rock-cut and ends at the south end of the City of David, not far from the Siloam Pool. Channel II used to be dated to the Iron Age but has now been securely dated to the Middle Bronze Age.
- The Round Chamber and Tunnel III. This is a large chamber about 10 meters southwest of the Gihon Spring, connected to Channel II by a short tunnel (III). The chamber had been dug into the bottom of a large, rock-cut "basin". The "basin", chamber and tunnel were abandoned and filled up in the 9th or 8th centuries BCE.
- Tunnel IV. This begins at the Round Chamber and runs northwest to join Tunnel VI.
- Tunnel VI. This begins at the Gihon Spring pool and runs west, then north, to end at the base of Warren's Shaft.
- Tunnels V and VII. These are short side-tunnels (from Tunnels IV and VI respectively) that were abandoned and played no role in the water system.
- Tunnel VIII. This long tunnel—also known as the Siloam Tunnel or Hezekiah's Tunnel—begins at the west end of Tunnel VI, near the base of Warren's Shaft, and winds its way south to the Siloam Pool at the southern end of the City of David. Tunnel VIII was built as a replacement for the surface Channel II and diverted waters from Gihon inside the walled city. There is general, though not universal, agreement that Tunnel VIII was dug in the late 8th century BCE by order of King Hezekiah in the face of the imminent Assyrian threat.

=== Fortified passage and Spring Tower ===
From about 1995 to 2005, Ronny Reich and Eli Shukron excavated a system of massive fortifications above, and upslope from, the Gihon Spring. These fortifications were built during the Middle Bronze Age (c.1800–1700 BCE), though they remained upstanding and possibly functional, through into the Iron Age, being repaired at various times. Recent excavations (since 2013) have uncovered houses of the 8th century BCE built against a part of these fortifications.

The fortifications consist of two parts: (1) a "fortified passage", and (2) the "Spring Tower". The "fortified passage" extends 30 metres downslope from the MBA city wall, where it once joined the Spring Tower. Its walls are up to 3 metres thick and preserved up to 9 metres high. The massive Spring Tower was built above the Gihon Spring. The passage and tower allowed townspeople to exit the town and go down to the spring within the protection of the fortifications. The excavators believe that the fortified passage could once have ascended to the crest of the hill, possibly to link up with a fortress or citadel there.

== See also ==
- List of artifacts significant to the Bible
- Turpan water system
- Jerusalem pilgrim road
- Jerusalem Water Channel
- Givati Parking Lot dig
