= Gaziantep Zoo =

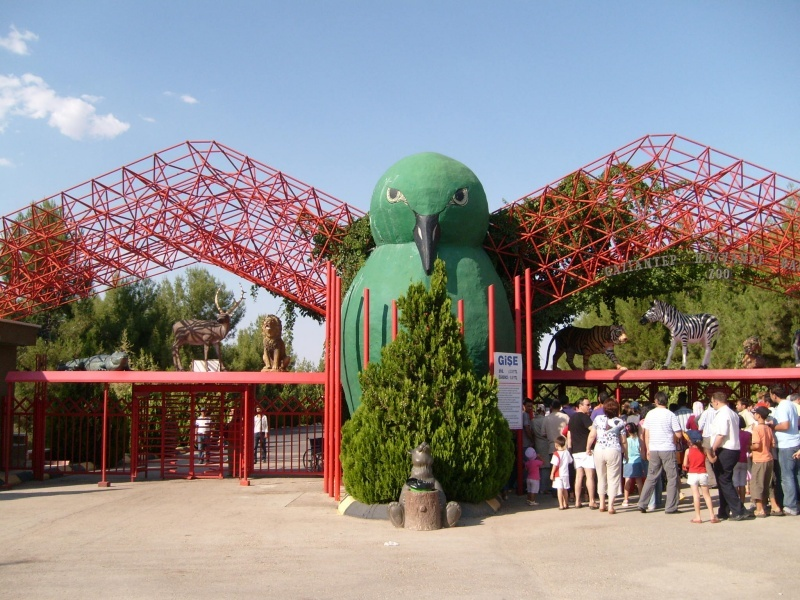
- Entrance to the zoo
- Interactive map of Gaziantep Zoo
- 37°02′N 37°18′E
- Date opened: 2001; 25 years ago
- Location: Şahinbey, Gaziantep, Turkey
- Land area: 1,000 daa (1.0 km^{2}; 0.39 sq mi)
- No. of animals: 4,000 (2023)
- No. of species: 350 (2023)
- Annual visitors: 5 million (2022)
- Website: www.gaziantepzoo.org

The Gaziantep Zoo (Turkish: Gaziantep Hayvanat Bahçesi) is a zoo in Gaziantep, southeastern Turkey. Opened in 2001, it is owned and operated by the Metropolitan Municipality of Gaziantep. The zoo, located in a Wildlife Protection and Recreation Area, includes a safari park and a zoology and nature museum.

== History ==
An area of 1,000 daa (1.0 km^{2}; 0.39 sq mi) within the Burç Forests has been allocated as a Wildlife Protection and Recreation Area, in Şahinbey district of Gaziantep Province, Turkey, The Metropolitan Municipality started the construction of the Gaziantep Zoo inside the Burç Nature Park in 1998. The zoo was opened to the public in 2001. In terms of area, it is the biggest in Turkey, and has a certain ranking in Europe.

== Safari Park ==
The zoo includes a Safari park, opened in 2018, with animals of Africa, stretching over 350 daa (0.35 km^{2}; 0.14 sq mi). It is the first safari park in Turkey. There are 700 animals in 50 species. The zoo provides buses for the visitors to ride around the safari park.

== Zoology and Nature Museum ==
The Zoology and Nature Museum was established on an area of 700 m^{2} (7,500 sq ft), where taxidermied specimens and fossils of zoo animals are exhibited. In the museum, there are 120 bony animals from 50 species, 427 winged animals from 128 species, 80 reptile animals, 78 sea creatures and seven giant skeletons.

== Species ==
As of 2023, the number of species in the zoo was 350, and there were 4,000 animals.

=== Mammals ===
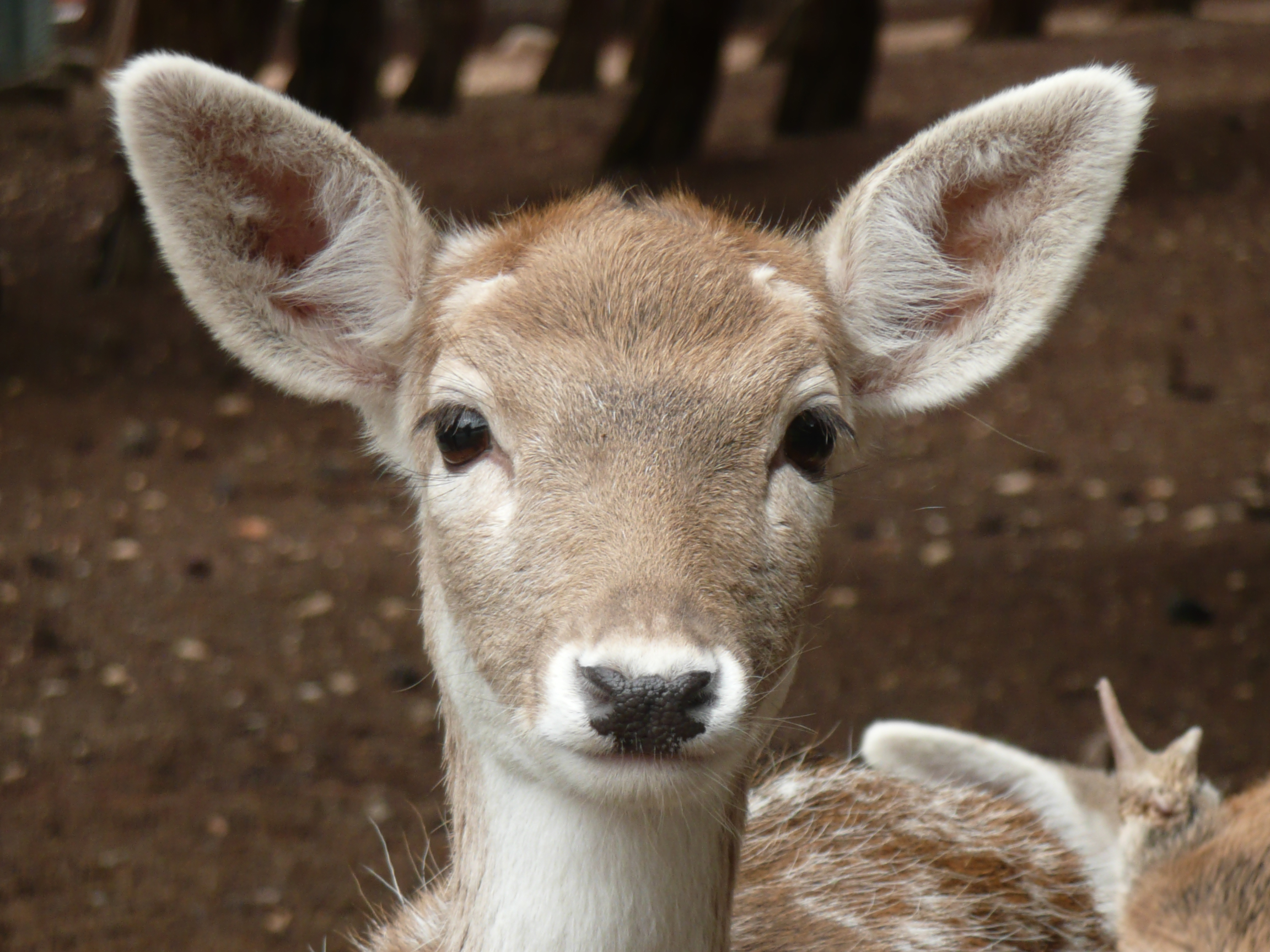
Fallowdeer

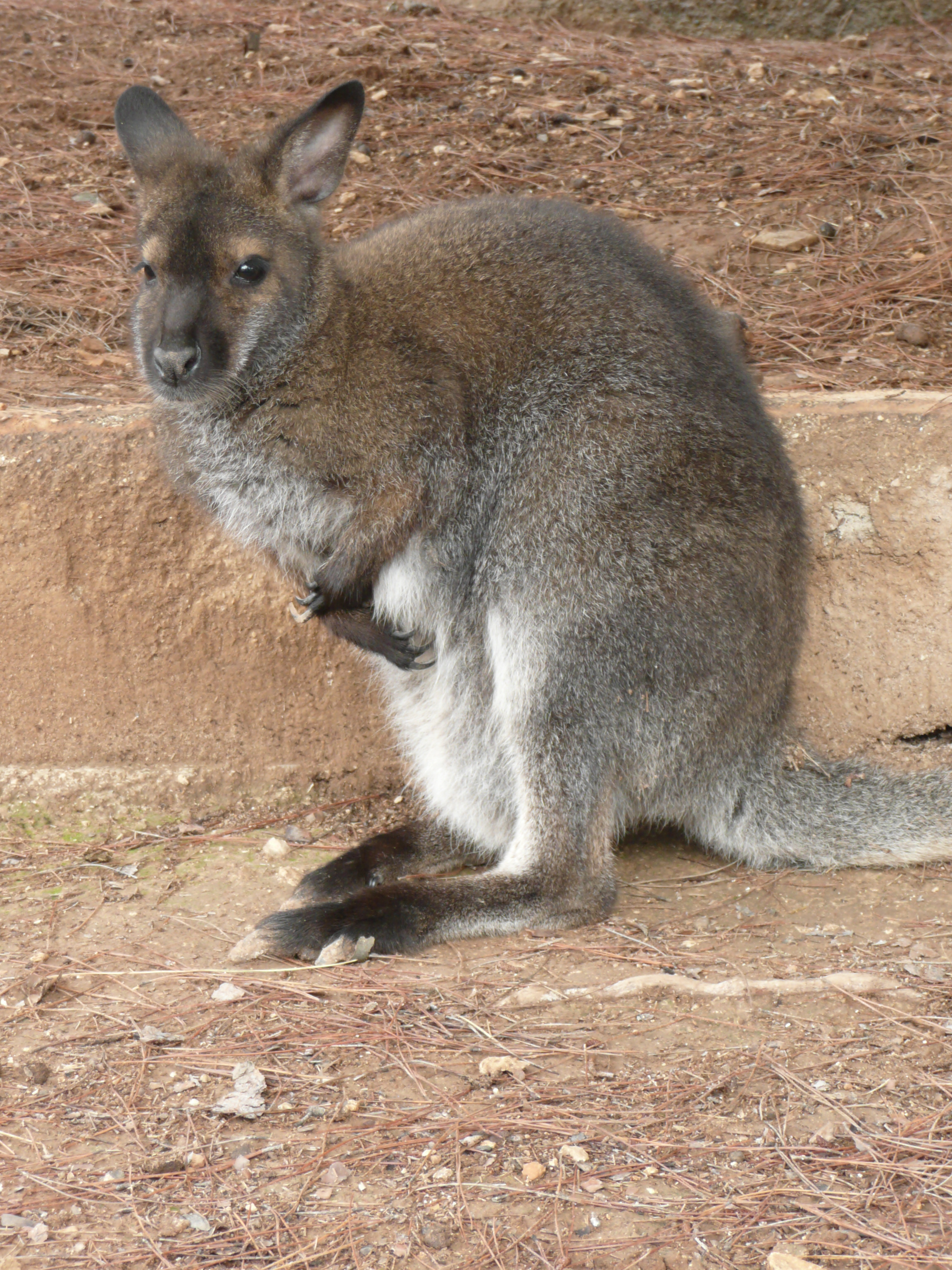
Red-necked wallaby

Within the Wildlife Protection Area (Zoo), there is a monkey house, a camel-llama house, a horse house (Hartinger and Pony horses), a kangaroo house. Also large cages exist for predatory animals like lions, tiger etc., and separate winter shelters for wild goats, wild sheep, deers, gazelles, Cameroon sheep and mouflon. Cloven-hoofed animals of all breeds are kept in areas of 20–25–30 daa (0.020–0.025–0.030 km^{2}; 0.0077–0.0097–0.0116 sq mi) with shock wires around them.

The monkey house on the 5 daa (5,000 m^{2})-big "Chimpanzee Island" consists of two parts, summer and winter, and there are eight breeds and 30 monkeys in total. In the predatory animals section, there are summer and winter sections, and the winter sections are heated with central heating. Lions, tigers, leopards, jaguars, pumas, bears, and wolves are in this section. Giraffes, camels, zebras, kangaroos, horses, and yaks live indoors in winter and in summer areas close to their natural environment in summer.

=== Birds ===
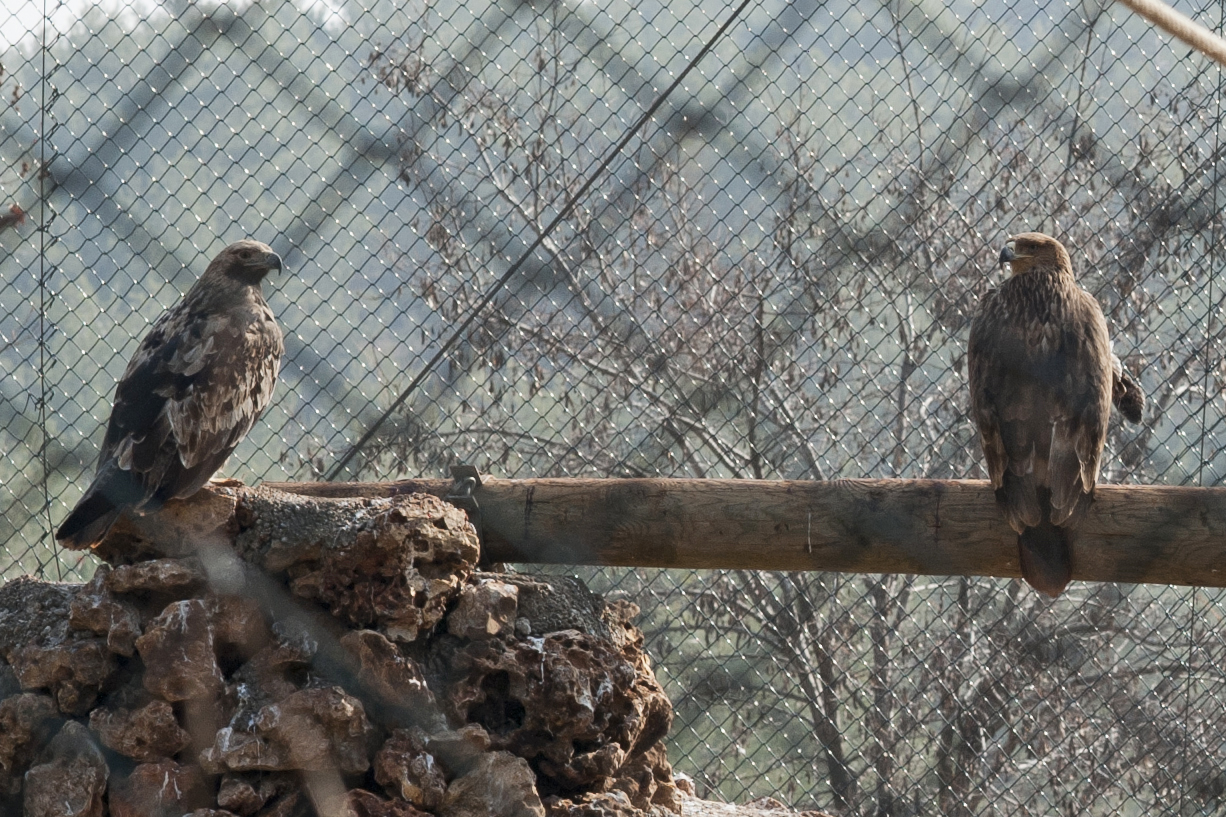
Eagles

The zoo has an ostrich house, a house for poultry, large bird cages, small bird cages, chicken-pheasant-sand partridge cages, cages for birds of prey (eagle-falcon-hawk), and a bird cage area with hundreds of bird species. It is designed in such a way that animals can fly easily in summer and winter. There are also closed sections that are heated in winter for birds living in tropical environments. There are 90 species and 929 animals in the bird cage.

=== Fish ===
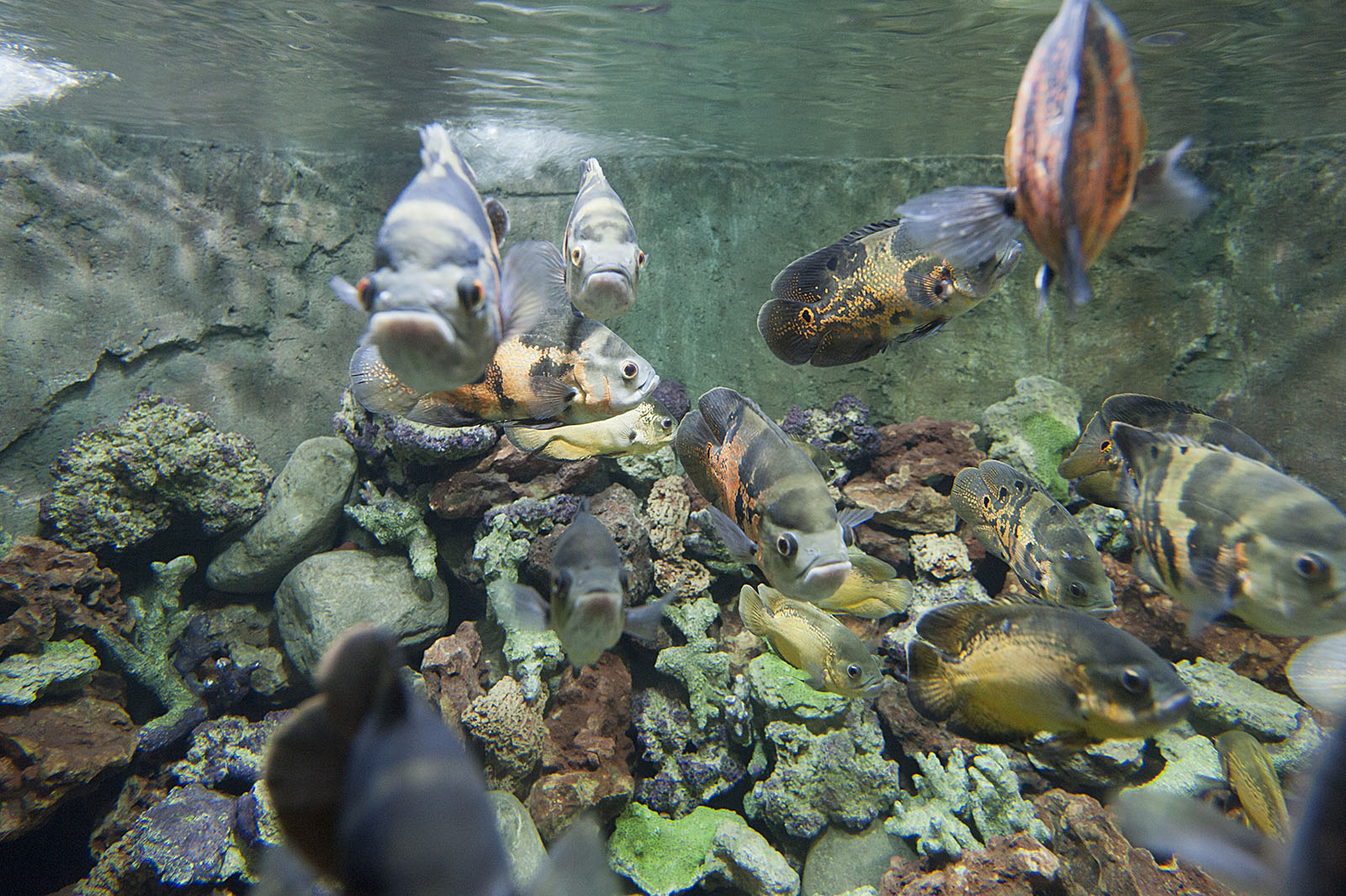
Aquarium

The 21-section aquarium for sea and freshwater creatures is one of the two largest aquariums in the world with a tank of 450 tons of water. There are a total of 21 aquariums, including three marine aquariums and 18 freshwater aquariums. In the aquarium section, there are 74 species and 2700 fish.

== Admission ==
The zoo is open to the public the year around, also on weekends, national and religious holidays. The opening hours are 09:00-18:00 in the summer season from April to September, and between 08:00 and 17:00 in the winter season from October to March. In 2022, the zoo attracted around five million visitors.

The students pay the half of the adult's fee in ₺ 20 (US$0.60).
