= Pilgrim road =

Pilgrim road may refer to:

- Pilgrims' way, route taken in a pilgrimage
- Pilgrims' Way, from Winchester to Canterbury
- Pilgrim's Road, from Asia Minor to the Holy Land
- Stepped street (Jerusalem), also known as the "Jerusalem pilgrim road"
- Pilgrim Road (album), Willard Grant Conspiracy album
