= Jerusalem Water Channel =

Central drainage channel of Jerusalem in the Second Temple period

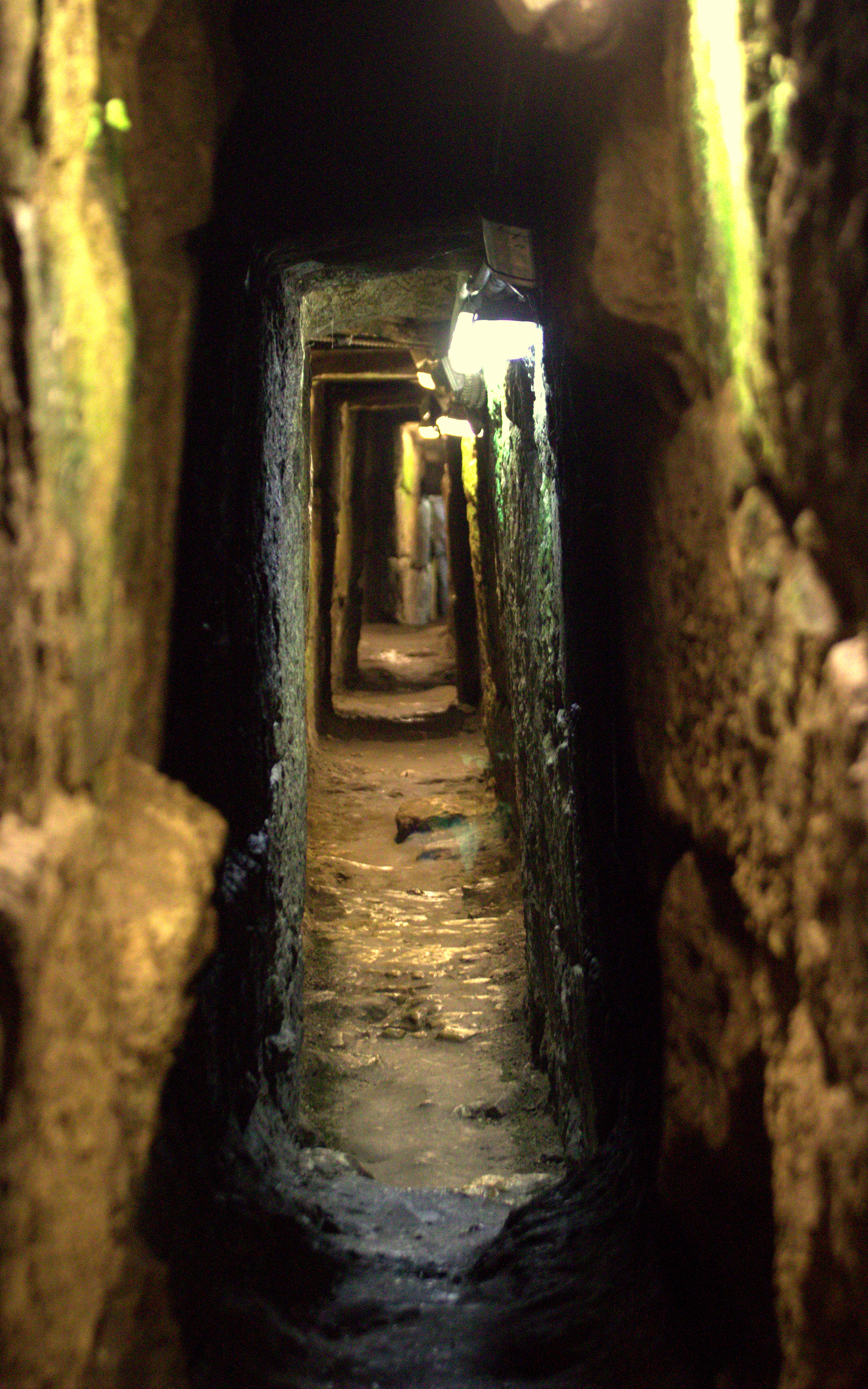
The Drainage Canal in the City of David

The Jerusalem Water Channel is a central drainage channel of Second Temple Jerusalem, now an archaeological site in Jerusalem. It is a large drainage tunnel or sewer that runs down the Tyropoeon Valley and once drained runoff and waste water from the city of Jerusalem. The excavators, Ronny Reich and Eli Shukron, date it to the later part of the Second Temple period. According to Leen Ritmeyer, the drain is mainly of Hasmonean age, with the exception of a bypass section near the southeast corner of the Temple Mount, which is Herodian.

== Description ==
The channel is about a kilometer long. The walls of the channel are made of heavy slabs of stone. Manholes with round, stone manhole covers are spaced along the length of the channel. Some of the original plaster is intact. Pottery and coins found in the water channel confirm its date. The water channel has been identified as the conduit described in Josephus Flavius' The Jewish War. According to Josephus, in the year 70 CE thousands of Jerusalemites took refuge from the Roman sacking of Jerusalem inside this water channel. Archaeologists attribute ash on the walls of the channel to fires set by the Romans attempting to force the Jewish survivors out of the channel.

Sections of the ancient road built along Jerusalem's central, or Tyropoean Valley, and the drain tunnel underneath it were first discovered by Charles Warren and Charles Wilson in 1867–1870. Frederick J. Bliss and Archibald C. Dickey of the Palestine Exploration Fund excavated parts of the road between 1894 and 1897. The find was reburied when their excavation concluded. Other sections were uncovered, then reburied, by later archaeologists, Jones in 1937 and Kathleen Kenyon in 1961–1967.

The tunnel was rediscovered in 2007 by archaeologists Ronny Reich and Eli Shukron who were excavating the monumental stepped street built during Pilate's governorship and leading up from the southern city gates via the Pool of Siloam and up towards the Temple when they happened on the water channel. Their excavations have eventually made accessible much of the length of the road between the Pool of Siloam and the south-eastern corner of the Herodian Temple Mount.

== See also ==
- City of David (Silwan)
- Excavations at the Temple Mount
- Givati Parking Lot dig
- Monumental stepped street (1st century CE) – the street above this drainage channel
- Robinson's Arch – situated at the upper end of the drainage channel
- Silwan
