= Robinson's Arch =

Monumental staircase in Jerusalem

- קשת רובינסון (Hebrew)
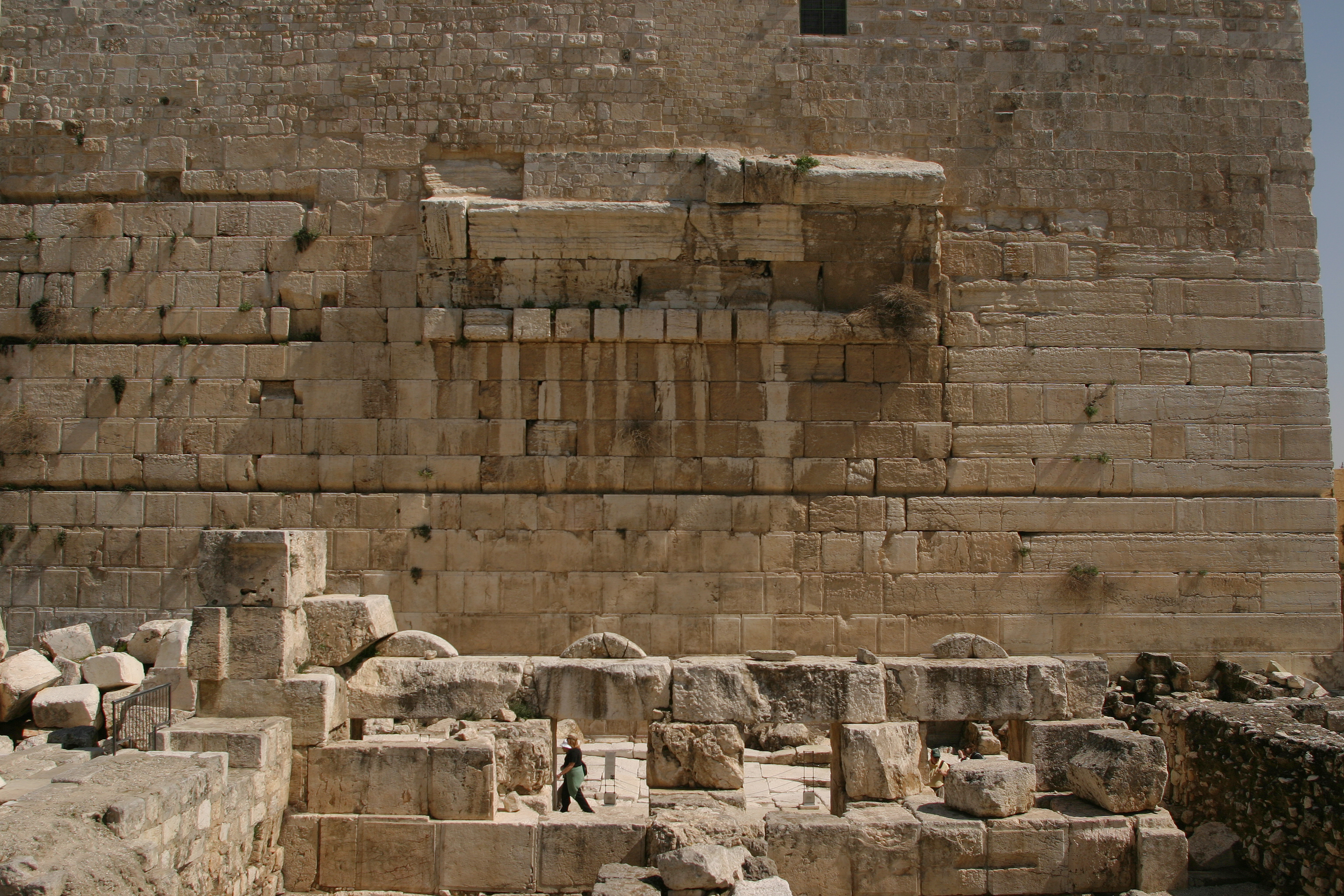
- Remains of Robinson's Arch above the Herodian street
- Interactive map of Robinson's Arch
- 31.775739°N 35.234719°E
- Periods: early Roman Empire
- Location: Jerusalem
- Part of: Herodian Temple Mount

History
- Built: c. 20 BCE
- Built by: Herod the Great
- Abandoned: 70 CE

Site notes
- Material: local limestone
- Height: 21.25 metres (69.7 ft)
- Excavation dates: 1867–1870, 1968–1977, 1994–1996
- Archaeologists: Charles Warren, Benjamin Mazar, Ronny Reich, Yaacov Billig, Eli Shukron
- Condition: ruin, archaeological park
- Public access: yes

Robinson's Arch was a monumental staircase carried by an unusually wide stone arch, which once stood at the southwestern corner of the Temple Mount in Jerusalem. It was built as part of the expansion of the Second Temple initiated by Herod the Great at the end of the 1st century BCE. Recent findings suggest that it may not have been completed until at least 20 years after his death. The massive stone span was constructed along with the retaining walls of the Temple Mount. It carried traffic up from ancient Jerusalem's Lower Market area and over the Tyropoeon street to the Royal Stoa complex on the esplanade of the Mount. The overpass was destroyed during the First Jewish–Roman War, only a few decades after its completion.

The arch is named after Biblical scholar Edward Robinson who identified its remnants in 1838, though it was noticed earlier by Frederick Catherwood. Robinson published his findings in his landmark work Biblical Researches in Palestine, in which he drew the connection with a bridge described in Josephus's Antiquities of the Jews and The Jewish War, concluding that its existence proves the antiquity of the Walls of Jerusalem. Excavations during the second half of the 20th century revealed both its purpose and the extent of its associated structures. Today the considerable surviving portions of the ancient overpass complex may be viewed by the public within the Jerusalem Archaeological Park. As it is adjacent to Jerusalem's Western Wall worship area, a portion is used by some groups as a place of prayer.

== History ==
Robinson's Arch was constructed as part of King Herod's renovation and expansion of the Second Temple, announced in 20–19 BCE. It was built to link the Tyropoeon Valley street, a major traffic artery in the Second Temple Period, with the Royal Stoa at the southern end of the Temple Mount platform.

The site abuts a major ancient intersection. Opposite lay a large public square fronting the Temple's main Hulda Gates. The Tyropoeon street itself was lined with shops and formed part of the city's Lower Market. The Royal Stoa, an exceptionally large basilica complex which served various commercial and legal functions, looked down on the intersection from atop the Temple platform. Although the Stoa stood on the Temple esplanade, it was constructed upon an expansion added by Herod. It was therefore evidently not considered sacred by some at the time, allowing it to be used for mundane activities. The heavy public traffic to and from this edifice accounts for the width of the stepped street, which approximates that of a modern four-lane highway.

Fragments of a gate once located at the top of the overpass have been recovered. From these, the gate's width has been calculated at 5 metres (16 ft). Due to the few extant gate remnants, it has not been established whether there were more than one gate. There may have been a single gate, a double gate, or even a triple gate opening into the Royal Stoa complex at this point. This was one of four gates along the western wall of the compound:

Now in the western quarters of the enclosure of the temple there were four gates; the first led to the king's palace, and went to a passage over the intermediate valley; two more led to the suburbs of the city; and the last led to the other city, where the road descended into the valley by a great number of steps, and thence up again by the ascent for the city lay over against the temple in the manner of a theater, and was encompassed with a deep valley along the entire south quarter.

— Josephus, Antiquities of the Jews 15:410.

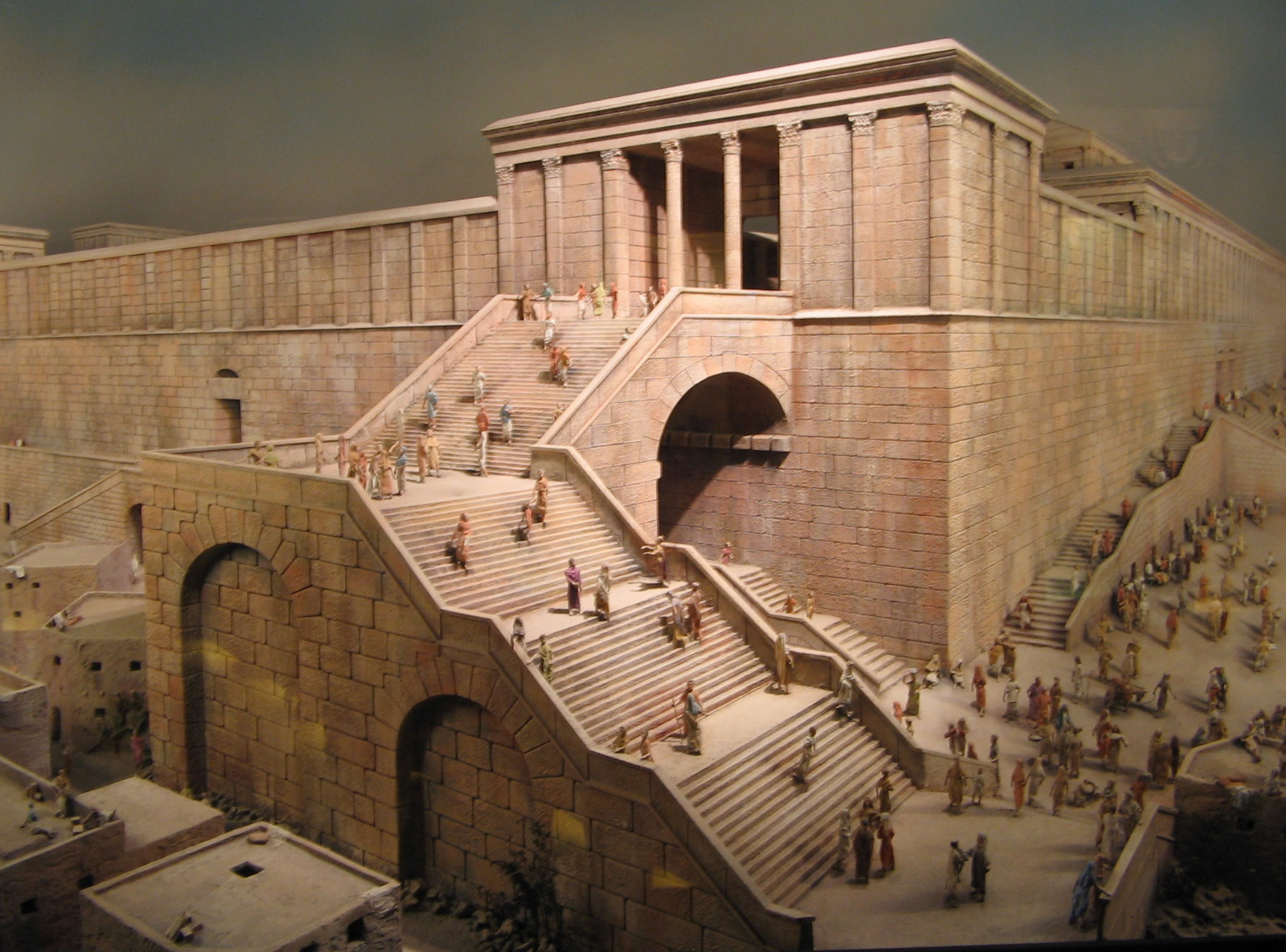
Proposed reconstruction of Robinson's Arch

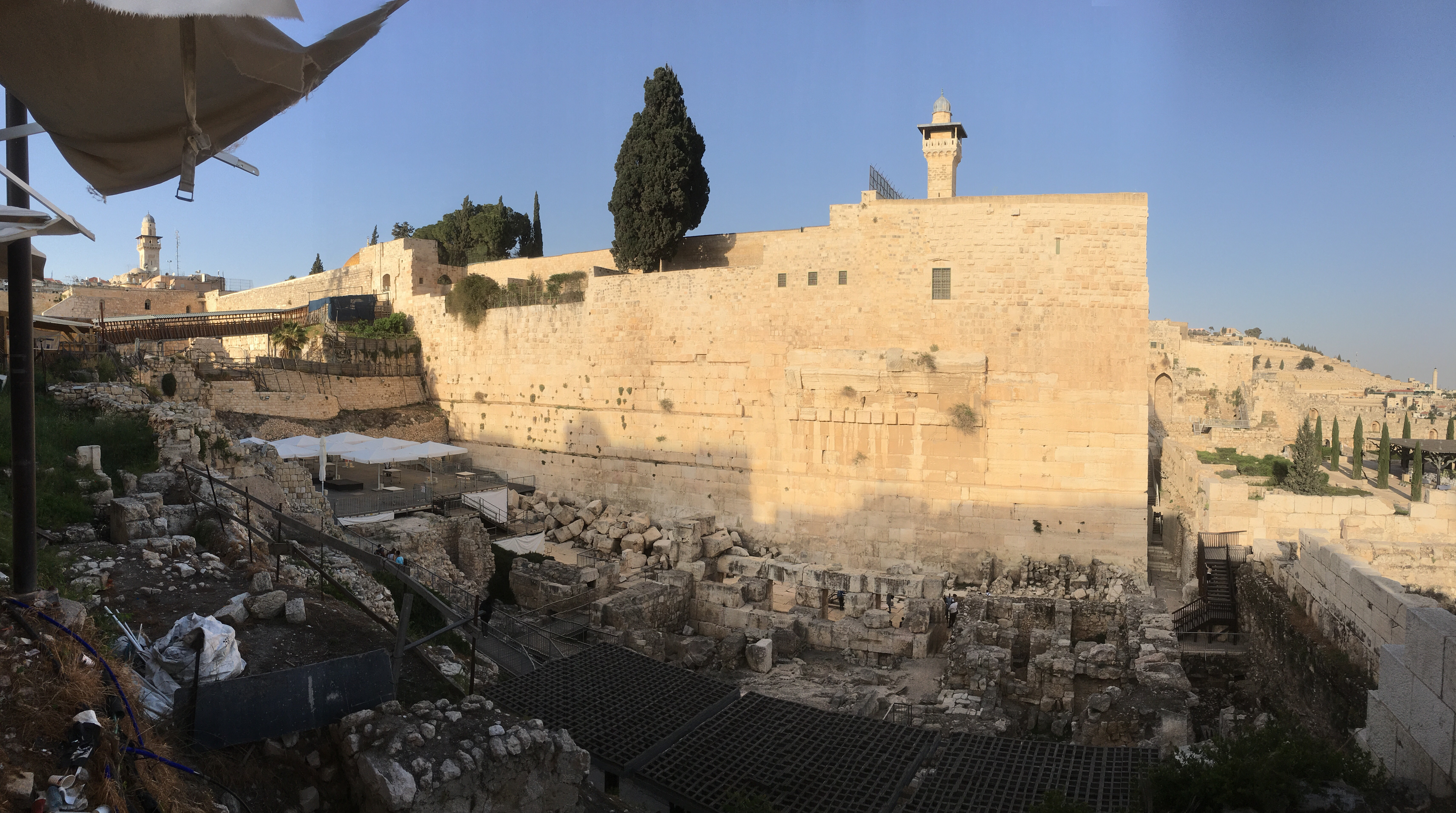
Modern view from a similar angle, showing the Western Wall on the left side of the picture and Robinson's Arch on the right

The conventional view of modern-archaeologists is to reckon the counting of these four gates (e.g. 1, 2, 3 and 4) from left to right, as one would count in Western societies, making Robinson's Arch the fourth and last in a row, counting from left to right. The question, however, which arises is whether or not Josephus, a Hebrew who was accustomed to reckon numbered objects while counting them from right to left, intended that this gate should, in fact, be the first gate mentioned in his description of the gates leading into the Temple Mount enclosure on its western side. According to the Mishnah (Middot 1:3), a compendium of oral teachings received and compiled by Rabbi Judah the Prince in 189 CE, only one gate on the western side of the Temple Mount was actually in use and "served for coming in and for going out," namely, the Kiponus Gate. The other gates, presumably, had been sealed earlier. Israeli archaeologist Benjamin Mazar surmised that the only serviceable gate on the western façade of the Temple Mount enclosure during the Second Temple's demise was Barclay's Gate (now known as the Mughrabi Gate), and which sits to the left of Robinson's Arch. This, he says, was called the Kiponus Gate. Others, dissenting, have suggested that the Kiponus Gate may have been where is now the Chain Gate, since directly below this gate there was once a bridge leading to the Temple Mount and supported by what is now known as Wilson's Arch. Warren's Gate also once served as an entrance into the Temple Mount, the occult passage now being used as a cistern and lying some 11.5 metres (38 ft) below the present surface level of the Temple Mount.

It is of singular importance that Josephus notes that of the gates built into the western enclosure of the Temple Mount, there was a bridge that also ascended to one of these gates and which same bridge was broken-off by the insurgents in the days of the Hasmoneans, during the reign of Pompey, most likely being one of the bridges leading to a gate that was henceforth made unserviceable. Josephus also alludes to another gate that opened to the Temple Mount from the Antonia fortress, one not normally used by the public. For fear of the Roman army gaining access to the Temple precincts through that gate, the Temple cloisters that joined to the Antonia were broken-off during the First Roman-Jewish War.

=== Construction ===
The arch was built as part of the Temple Mount's massive western retaining wall, which forms its eastern support. The voussoirs spring from a row of impost blocks which were cut to produce a dentil pattern. There have been some theories which speculate that the dentils were employed as part of a system used to shore up timber forms used during construction. However, this was a common decorative element employed in the region at the time, and archaeologists have noted that in this region of limited forests it is much more likely that packed earth, rather than expensive timbers, was used to support the form on which the arch was constructed.

Upon completion the arch spanned 15 metres (49 ft) and had a width of 15.2 metres (50 ft). The stepped street it bore over a series of seven additional arches was more than 35 metres (115 ft) in length. Robinson's Arch itself stood 12 metres (39 ft) to the north of the southwestern corner of the Temple Mount's retaining wall, soaring some 17 metres (56 ft) over the ancient Tyropoeon street that once ran along the Temple Mount's western wall. It was among the most massive stone arches of classical antiquity.

Although Herod's renovation of the Second Temple was initiated in late 1st century BCE, excavations beneath the street near the arch revealed three oil lamps of a type common in the first century CE and 17 identifiable coins, several of which were struck by Valerius Gratus, Roman procurator of Judea, in the year 17/18 CE. This means that the arch and nearby sections of the Western Wall were constructed after this date.

=== Destruction ===
The destruction of Robinson's Arch occurred during the events surrounding the Roman sacking of Jerusalem in 70 CE. It has traditionally been blamed on the Roman legions which destroyed the Temple Mount enclosure and eventually set fire to the entire city. More recently, this has been attributed to the Zealot factions which had wrested control of the Temple Mount and fortified it prior to its fall. Some of these continued to hold out in Jerusalem's Upper City for a month after the city had been breached by the Romans. By wrecking the overpass, as well as the viaduct at Wilson's Arch to the north, the defenders made access to the Temple platform much more difficult for besieging forces.

South of the Temple Mount, excavators have uncovered an inscribed Roman milestone bearing the names of Vespasian and Titus, fashioned from one of the staircase handrails which stood on top of the arch. This places the destruction of the arch at no later than 79 CE.

=== Hebrew inscription ===
The so-called Isaiah Stone, located under Robinson's Arch, has a carved inscription in Paleo-Hasmonian Hebrew Alphabet with a partial and slightly faulty quote from (or paraphrase of) Isaiah 66:14:

==== Transliteration and Translation ====
uū·rəeīi·tęɱ uē·šāš līvə·cęɱ uə·aēţəmōutīi·cęɱ cē·dëšëetī·fârēֹĥânāh "And them will see, and rejoice your heart, and your bones like grass [shall flourish ...]"

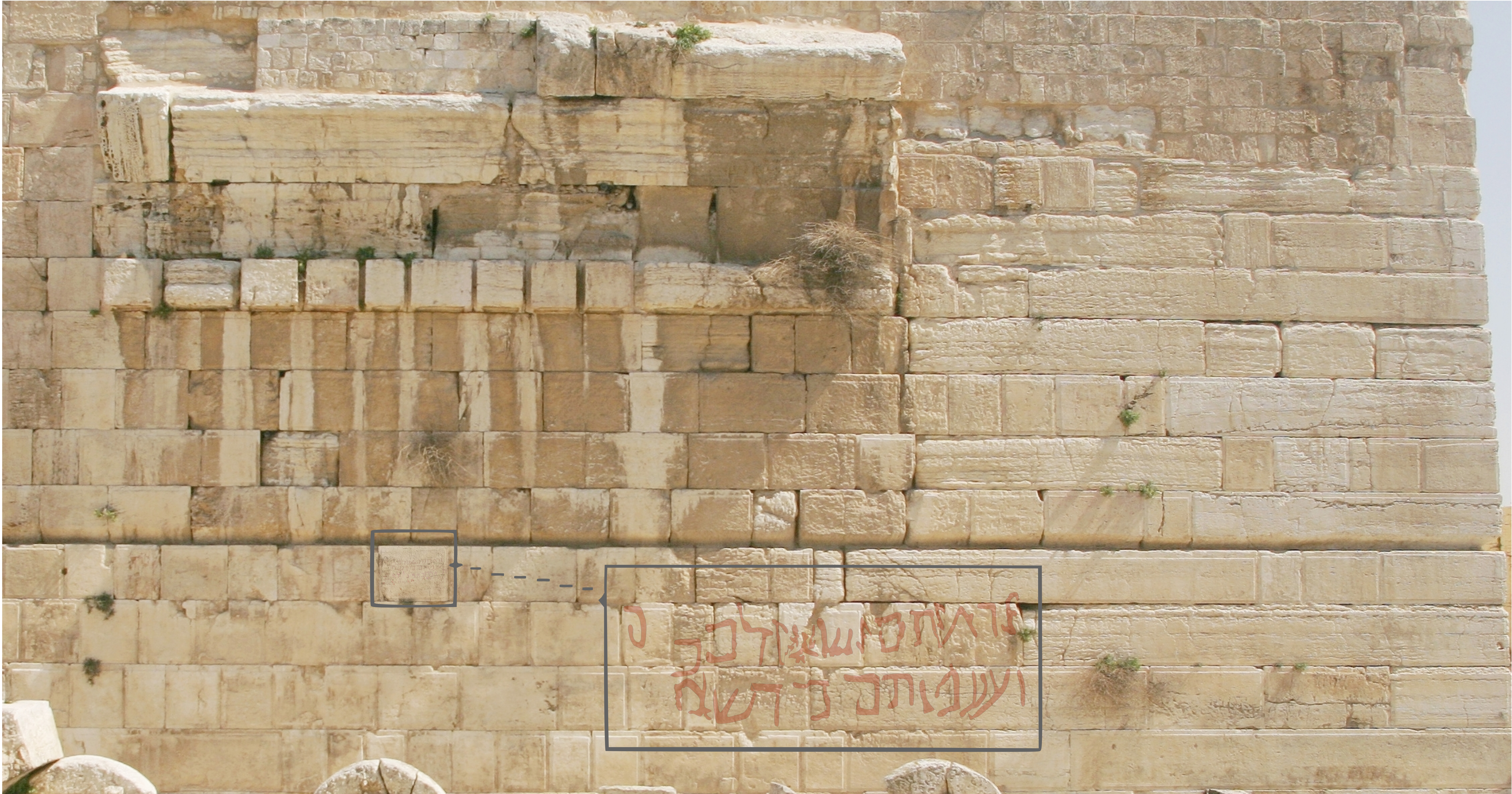
The writing on Robinson's Arch on the western side of the Temple-Mount.

The correct line from Isaiah would read "...your bodies". This gave room to various interpretations, some speculating about it being written during a period of hope for Jews. Alternatively, it might be connected to nearby graves. The inscription has tentatively been dated to the 4th-8th century, some extending the possible timespan all the way to the 11th century.

== Rediscovery and excavations ==
Excerpts from Robinson's description of the discovery of the Arch

At the first view of these walls, I was led to the persuasion, that the lower portions had belonged to the ancient temple; and every subsequent visit only served to strengthen this conviction. The size of the stones and the heterogeneous character of the walls, render it a matter beyond all doubt, that the former were never laid in their present places by the Muhammedans; and the peculiar form in which they are hewn, does not properly belong, so far as I know, either to Saracenic or to Roman architecture. Indeed, every thing seems to point to a Jewish origin; and a discovery which we made in the course of our examination, reduces this hypothesis to an absolute certainty...
...we observed several of the large stones jutting out from the western wall... the stones had the appearance of having once belonged to a large arch. At this remark a train of thought flashed upon my mind, which I hardly dared to follow out, until I had again repaired to the spot, in order to satisfy myself with my own eyes, as to the truth or falsehood of the suggestion. I found it even so!…This arch could only have belonged to The Bridge, which according to Josephus led from this part of the temple to the Xystus on Zion; and it proves incontestably the antiquity of that portion of the wall from which it springs…. The existence of these remains of the ancient bridge, seems to remove all doubt as to the identity of this part of the enclosure of the mosk with that of the ancient temple. How they can have remained for so many ages unseen or unnoticed by any writer or traveller, is a problem, which I would not undertake fully to solve. One cause has probably been the general oblivion, or want of knowledge, that any such bridge ever existed. It is mentioned by no writer but Josephus; and even by him only incidentally, though in five different places...
...Here then we have indisputable remains of Jewish antiquity, consisting of an important portion of the western wall of the ancient temple area... We have, then, the two extremities of the ancient southern wall; which, as Josephus informs us, extended from the eastern to the western valley, and could not be prolonged further. Thus we are led irresistibly to the conclusion, that the area of the Jewish temple was identical on its western, eastern, and southern sides, with the present enclosure of the Haram.

— Edward Robinson, Biblical Researches in Palestine, 1841

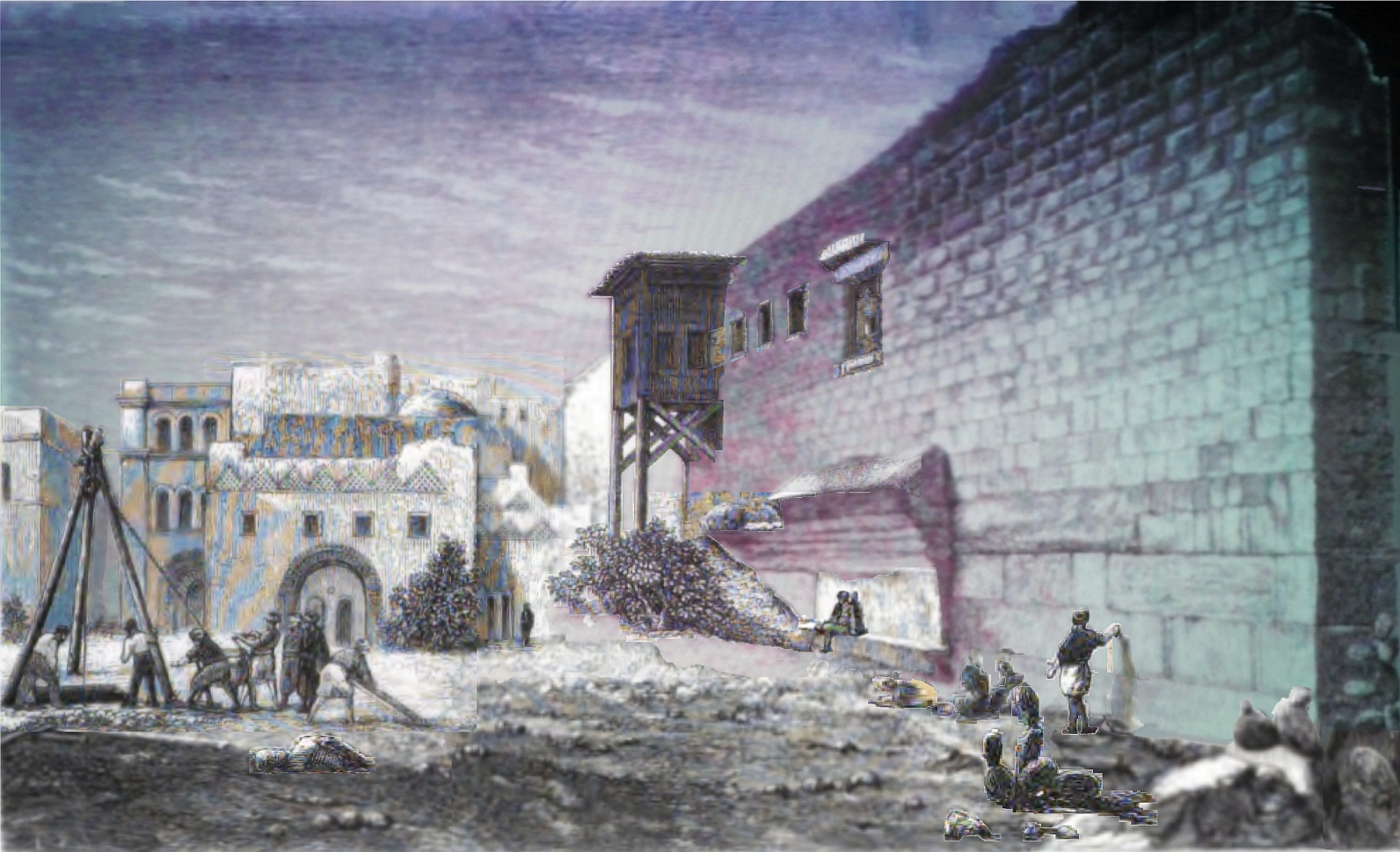
A drawing from 1871 showing youngs working in left, and the stone of the arch in the right side with someone reading or writing a stone.

Four stone courses of the eastern spring of the arch, consisting of a row of impost blocks and three layers of voussoirs, have survived to modern times. This remnant was first identified in 1838 by Biblical scholar Edward Robinson and now bears his name. At that time, prior to any excavations, remains of the arch were at ground level. The ancient street level lay far underground, buried by debris from destruction of structures on the Temple Mount and later fill dumped into the Tyropoeon Valley over the centuries. Robinson believed he had identified the eastern edge of a bridge that linked the Temple Compound with the Upper City which lay on the ridge to the west.

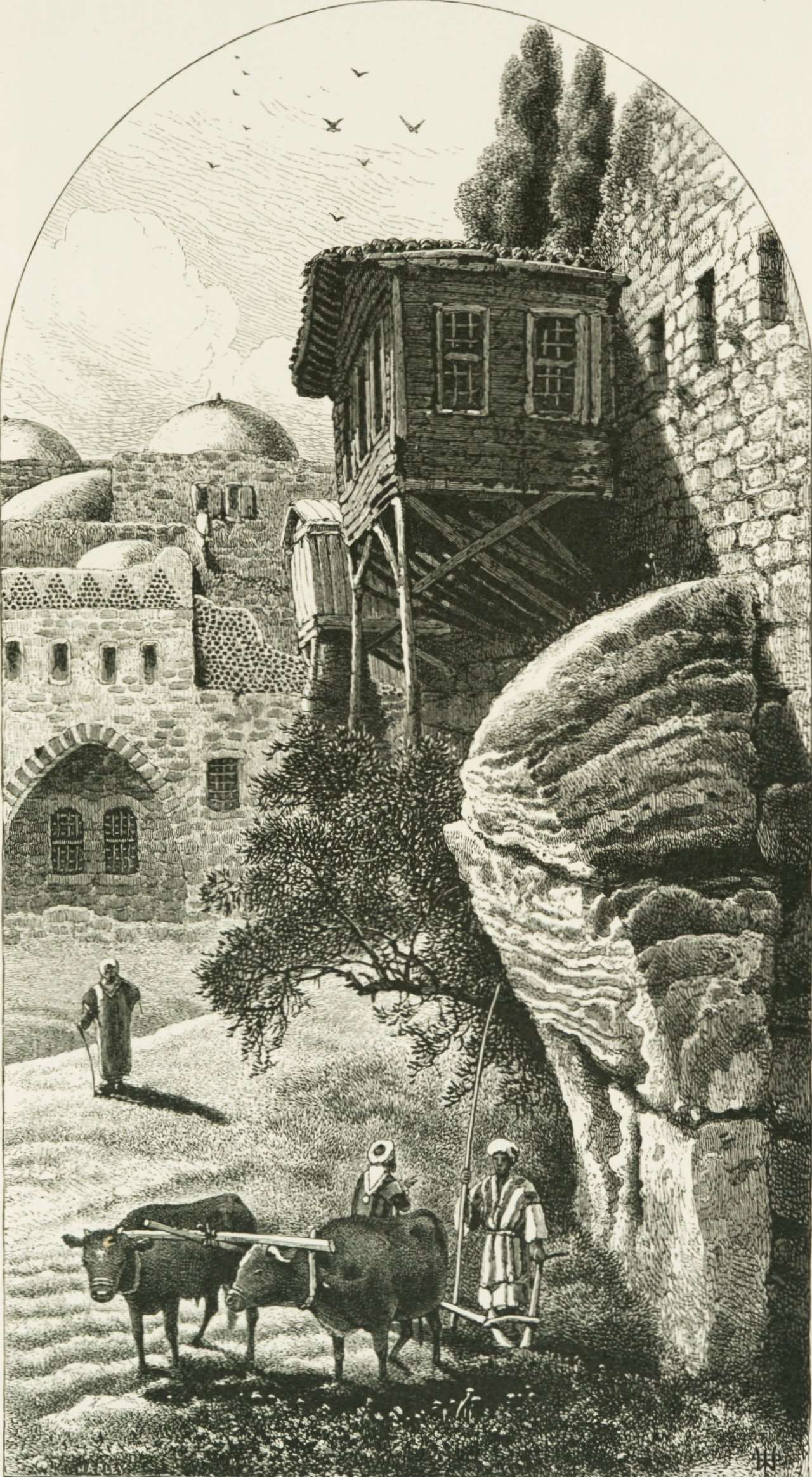
Robinson's Arch drawing published in 1880. The roof strata of the arch were part of a bridge which crossed over the street to the court. The drawing shows shepherds with cows gathering olives from a small tree that was near to the arch. In background is another arch and over it is a bridge and the trees from the Temple Court Plato are in right.

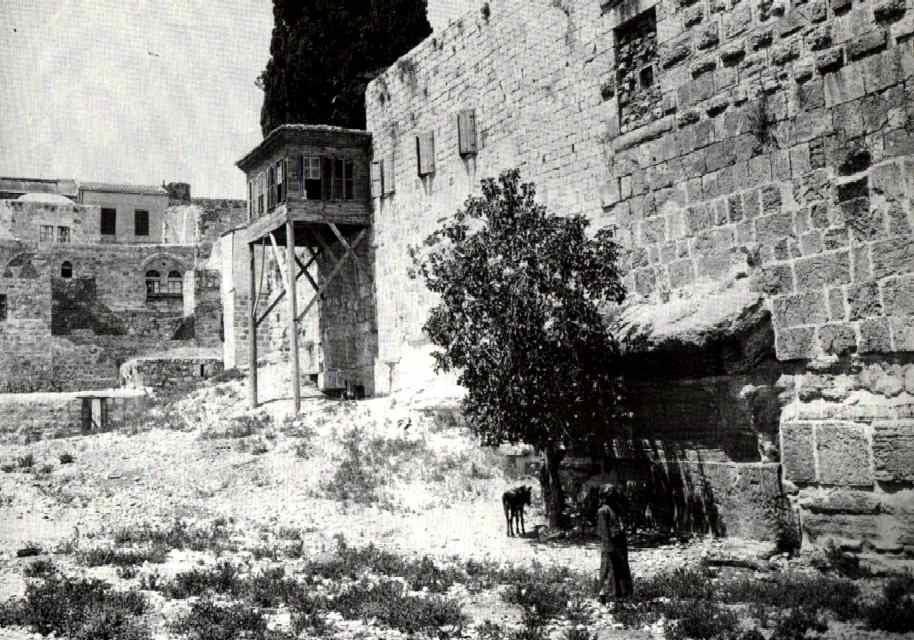
Mid–19th-century view of Robinson's Arch

During his investigations of 1867–1870, Charles Warren noted the presence of a large pier 13 metres (43 ft) west of the wall and the remains of the arch. Warren concluded this was but one of many supports for a supposed series of arches supporting a bridge spanning the valley. He subsequently dug a series of seven shafts to the west at regular intervals, yet found no evidence of additional piers.

Only during Benjamin Mazar's excavations between 1968 and 1977 was it discovered that the pier was in fact the western support of a single great arch. The uncovered pier, 15.2 metres (50 ft) long and 3.6 metres (12 ft) wide, was preserved to a height of 5 metres (16 ft). Within its base were found four small hollow spaces, possibly for shops opening onto the Herodian–era Tyropoeon street that passes beneath the arch. The lintels of these survive in place and are themselves arched to relieve pressure from the weight of the pier's superstructure. Mazar's excavations have revealed that the same pier was also the eastern external wall of a monumental building which Mazar suggested was the archives of Jerusalem mentioned by Josephus. South of the building, excavators found the remains of six vault–supporting piers, gradually decreasing in height southwards over a distance of 35 metres (115 ft). These vaults, the building and Robinson's Arch, all supported a monumental flight of stairs which led the street up and over the Typropoeon street to the gate of the Royal Stoa at the top of the Temple Mount platform. Numerous stone steps, some still adjoined, were also found nearby.

Excavations near the arch resumed between 1994 and 1996, directed by Ronny Reich and Yaacov Billig. These have uncovered much of the debris from the collapse of the arch. The remains include both stairs from the staircase and stones from its rounded handrails. Some of these are still visible where they were found, at the Jerusalem Archaeological Park now occupying the site.

== Egalitarian prayer site ==
=== Non-Orthodox vs Orthodox ===
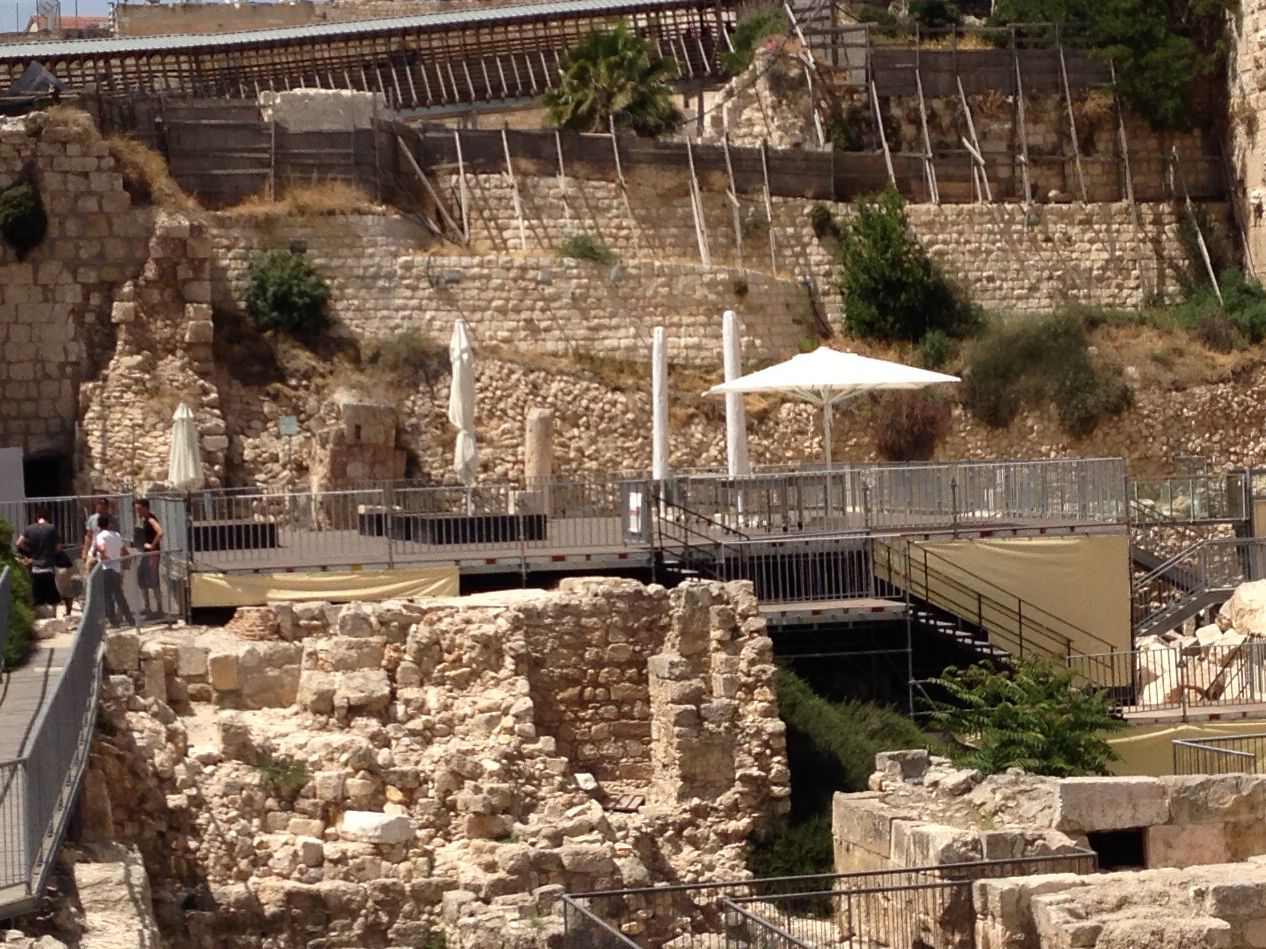
Azarat Yisrael Plaza (prayer platform), Robinson's Arch, established August 2013

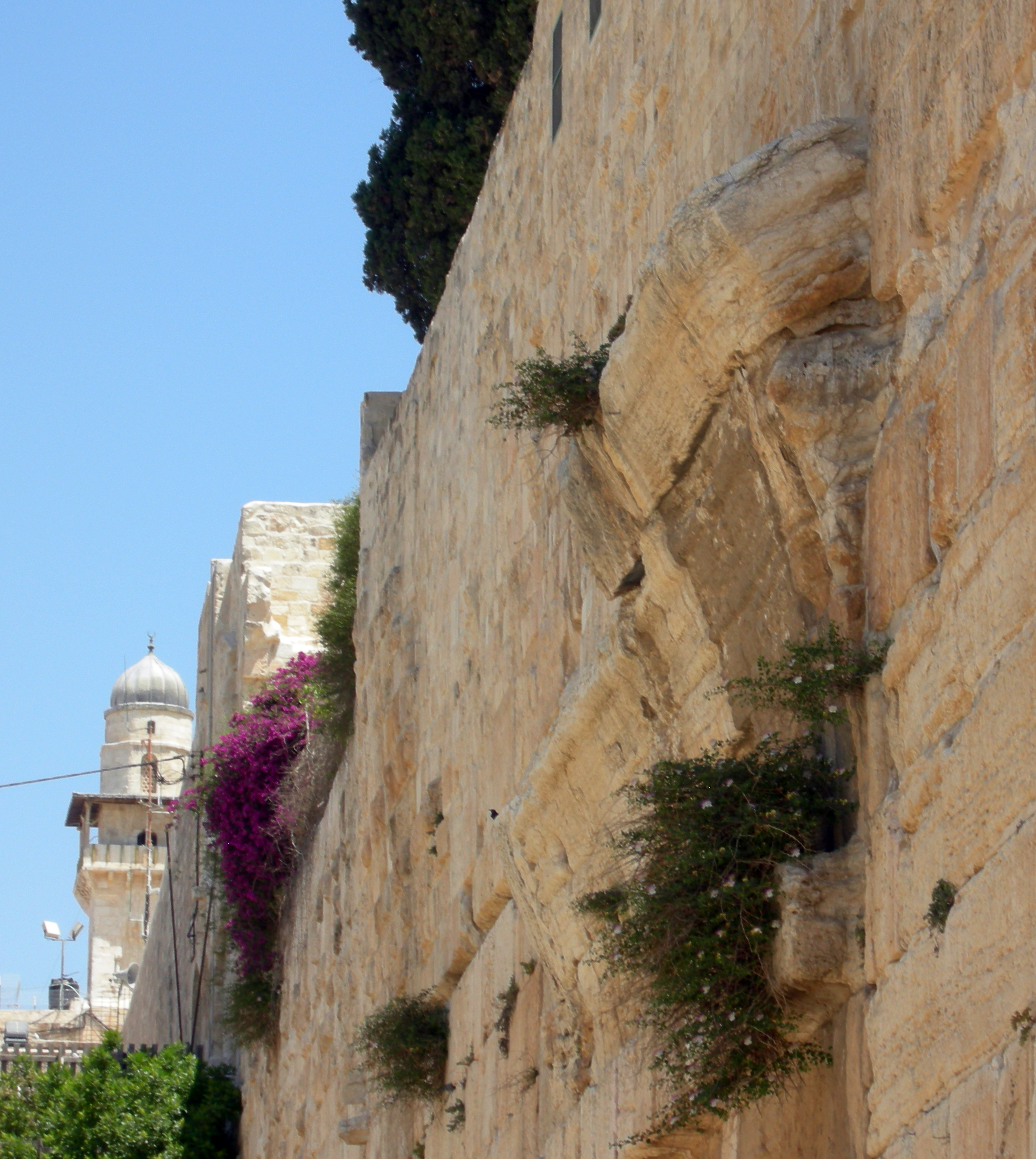
Robinson's Arch, 2009

The location of the arch along the western wall of the Temple Mount, yet at a distance from the Western Wall Plaza, has prompted the Israeli Government to allow the area to be used for alternative, non-Orthodox services. In 2003 Israel's Supreme Court disallowed women from reading the Torah or wearing traditional prayer shawls at the plaza itself, yet instructed the Israeli government to prepare the site of Robinson's Arch to host such events. The site was inaugurated in August 2004 and has since hosted services by Reform and Conservative groups, as well as by other movements, such as Women of the Wall activists. This has resulted in the location being referred to as HaKotel HaMasorti ("Masorti Wall" or "Traditional Wall", meaning traditional Jewish observance not as stringent as Orthodoxy—as opposed to the Kotel HaMaaravi ("Western Wall"), which is Orthodox).

The court-ordered compromise, however, continues to be contentious. Reform and Women of the Wall activists consider the location to be unsatisfactory, in part due to the designation of the park as an archaeological site and the resulting restrictions on access and worship, and in part due to their perceived treatment as "second-class citizens" and their exclusion from the Western Wall plaza. Eric Yoffie, president of the Union for Reform Judaism, has also expressed the opinion that "The wall as it's been understood by the Jewish people does not mean Robinson's Arch ... It just doesn't."

In April 2013 Jewish Agency chairman Nathan Sharansky proposed a solution for resolving the controversy over female prayer at the Western Wall, calling for the renovation of the site at the foot of Robinson's Arch to make it accessible to worshippers at all hours of the day (and not depend on archaeological site hours). On 25 August 2013, a new 4,480 square foot prayer platform was completed at Robinson's Arch, with access at all hours, as promised. The area is named "Azarat Yisrael" (or in more proper pronunciation, "Ezrat Yisrael"). After some controversy regarding the question of authority over this prayer area, the announcement was made that it would come under the authority of a future government-appointed "pluralist council" that would include non-Orthodox representatives.

In January 2017, the Israeli High Court ruled that if the government of Israel could not find "good cause" to prohibit women reading from the Torah in prayer services at the Western Wall within 30 days, women could do so; they also ruled that the Israeli government could no longer argue that the Robinson's Arch area of the plaza is "access to the Western Wall" (whereas the Orthodox argued for prohibiting non-Orthodox worship there due to its causing limitations of access to the Western Wall).

=== Secular opposition ===
Dan Bahat, former district archaeologist of Jerusalem who headed the Western Wall Tunnel excavations in the years 1986–2007, filed in 2018 a High Court petition to stop construction at the site, fearing the destruction of archaeological witnesses to the 70 CE destruction of the Temple. He decried the transformation of the Western Wall southwards of the tunnels, from an iconic historical site into a regulated place of worship: "The Western Wall is sacrosanct. But out of a national monument, it has become a synagogue."

== See also ==
- Acra (fortress)
- Excavations at the Temple Mount
- Freedom of religion in Israel
- Herod's Temple
- Jerusalem during the Second Temple Period
- Monumental stepped street (1st century CE)
- Jerusalem Water Channel, running underneath the monumental stepped street
- Wilson's Arch
