= Simchat Beit HaShoeivah =

Jewish celebration

Vizhnitz Simchas Beis HaShoeiva in Bnei Brak on October 9, 2006

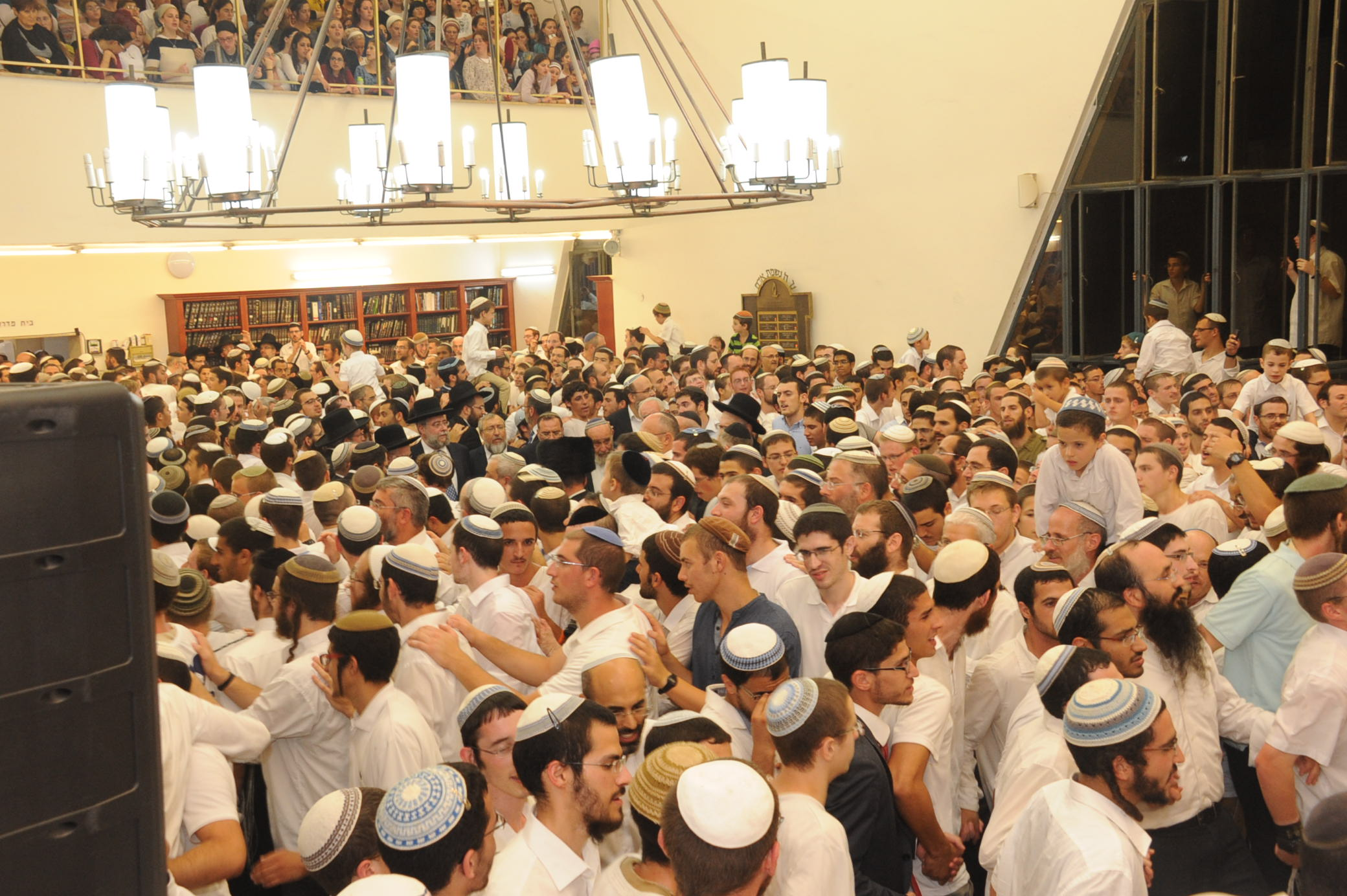
Mercaz HaRav, 2017

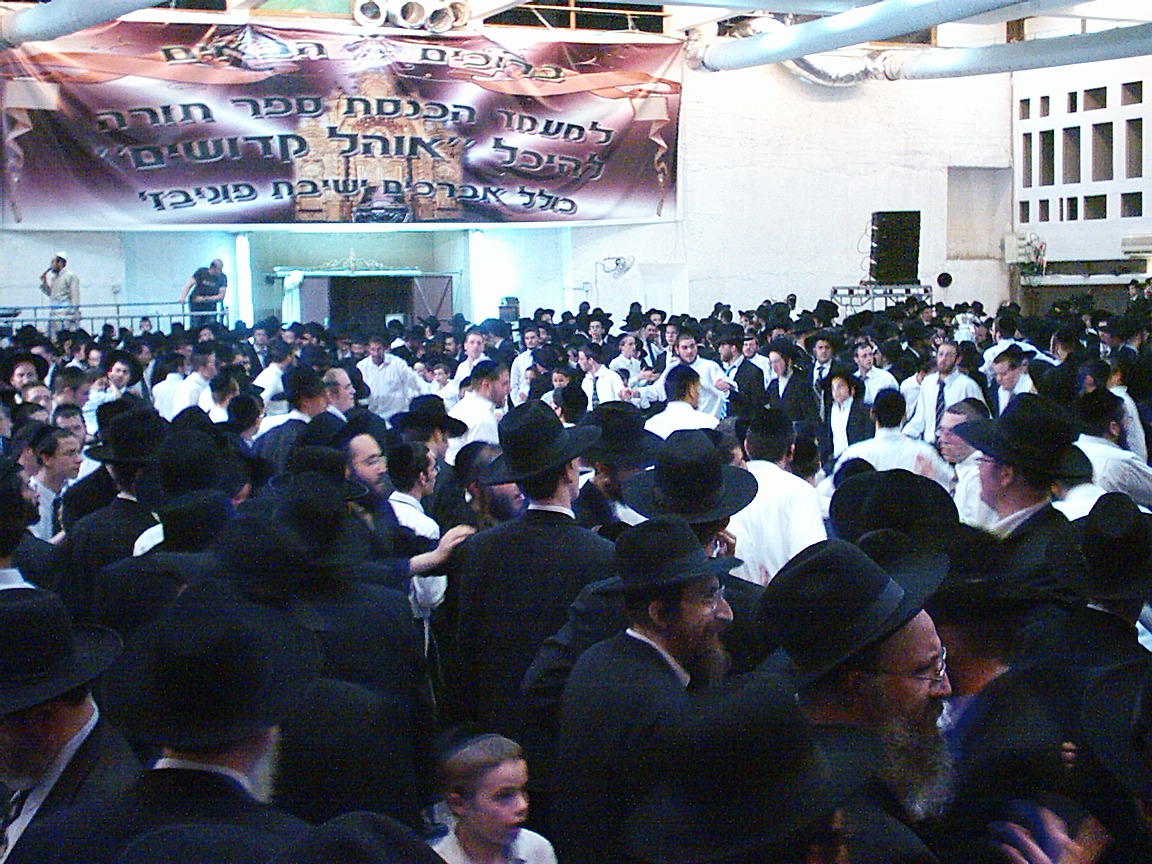
The Ponevezh Simchas Beis HaShoeiva on October 9, 2006

Simchat Beit Hashoevah or Simchas Beis Hashoeiva (Hebrew: שמחת בית השואבה, lit. 'Rejoicing of the Water-Drawing House') is a special celebration held by Jews during the intermediate days of Sukkot.

== Origin ==
When the Temple in Jerusalem stood, a unique service was performed every morning throughout the Sukkot holiday: Nisukh HaMayim (Hebrew: ניסוך המים, lit. 'Pouring of the water'). According to the Talmud, Sukkot is the time of year in which God judges the world for rainfall; therefore this ceremony, like the taking of the Four Species, invokes God's blessing for rain in its proper time. According to the Mishnah, the water for the libation ceremony was drawn from the Pool of Siloam in the City of David, and carried up the Jerusalem pilgrim road to the Temple.

Afterwards, every night in the outer Temple courtyard, tens of thousands of spectators would gather to watch the Simchat Beit HaShoeivah (Rejoicing at the Place of the Water-Drawing), as the most pious members of the community danced and sang songs of praise to God. The dancers would carry lit torches, and were accompanied by the harps, lyres, cymbals and trumpets of the Levites. According to the Mishnah, "He who has not seen the rejoicing at the Place of the Water-Drawing has never seen rejoicing in his life." Throughout Sukkot, the city of Jerusalem teemed with Jewish families who came on the holiday pilgrimage and joined together for feasting and Torah study. A partition separating men and women was erected for this occasion.

It was related of Rabban Shimon ben Gamliel that when he was rejoicing with the joy of the Water-Drawing he would take eight burning torches in one hand and toss them upwards; he tossed one and caught one, and never did one touch the other.

== Modern celebrations ==
Nowadays, the historical celebrations are recalled via a Simchat Beit HaShoeivah gathering of music, dance, and refreshments. This event takes place in a central location such as a synagogue, yeshiva, or place of study. Refreshments are served in the adjoining sukkah. Live bands often accompany the dancers. The festivities usually begin late in the evening, and can last long into the night.

The modern practice of Simchat Beit HaShoeivah appears to have been formally instituted by Rabbi Hayyim ben Jacob Abulafia in İzmir in 1726, as a remembrance of Temple practice ('zecher lamikdash'), after having been a voluntary initiative for some time beforehand. Apparently the custom spread to the Land of Israel when Abulafia moved there in 1740. From there the custom was spread by visitors to Israel, and by 1782 it had reached Lithuania. Nowadays it is commonly practiced among diverse communities - Ashkenazi, Sephardi, Hassidic, Misnagdim, and more.

In Jerusalem, there is a Simchas Beis HaShoevah at many Hasidic main synagogues on most nights of Sukkos. Particularly the eastern part of Meah Shearim is very busy, with large festivals being held at Karlin, Toldos Aharon, Toldos Avrohom Yitzchok and Breslov. The largest of these is the one at Toldos Aharon. Other places where festivities are held are the main synagogues of Dushinsky and Belz, as well as tens of smaller places around the city.
