= Pilgrim's Road =

Route through Asia Minor

The Pilgrim's Road or Pilgrims' Road was a route through Asia Minor to the Holy Land.

== Description ==
The name Pilgrim's Road has been traditionally given to the network of roads that connected Constantinople with the eastern provinces of the Byzantine Empire such as Syria and Arabia. The route started in Chalcedon, opposite to Constantinople and went to Antioch via Nicomedia, Nicaea, Ancyra, the Cilician Gates and then Tarsus. The surface was paved with small pebbles covered with gravel shortly after the Roman conquest. It was widened from 21.5 feet to 28 feet in the Christian era to accommodate commercial travel.

Anatolia in the 8th century. The Pilgrim's road went from Chalcedon next to Constantinople via Nicomedia, Nicaea, Ancyra and Tarsos to Antioch.

While the route ensured primarily a rapid connection especially for military forces, pilgrims such as the anonymous pilgrim of Bordeaux who wrote the Itinerarium Burdigalense came to take this route in 333-34 and thus gave it the name Pilgrim's road. Apart from the Itinerarium Burdigalense, two other sources, the Itinerarium Antonini and the Tabula Peutingeriana, describe the route with only one minor divergence between the sources. Pilgrims would also often take detours to visit shrines of saints, such as Egeria who visited the shrine of St. Thecla close to Tarsus in the 380d.

== History ==
The possibly first prominent pilgrim that took the Pilgrim's road was the mother of Constantine the Great, Helena, whose route was retraced by the author of the Itinerarium Burdigalense and who took around two months to get from Constantinople to Jerusalem in 326. In the century after the Bordeaux pilgrim, possibly on instigation of bishop Basil of Caesarea, many hostels were founded along the road, often by wealthy Roman women. These hostels, also known as xenodochia, resembled earlier Greek or Roman inns but were catering specifically to pilgrims, were operated by monks and were typically funded from Church funds or by donations so that also poor pilgrims could use the facilities.

During the middle Byzantine period the route via Ancyra fell out of favour as the Byzantines preferred the route to the Cilician Gates via Dorylaeum, Amorium and Iconium. There were also several other important roads that branched of the Pilgrim's road to the Amasia and Neocaesarea or to Melitene.

== See also ==
- First Crusade, who used this route

Other pilgrimage routes

- Hajj, Muslim pilgrimage, using routes known as Darb al-Hajj
- Stepped street (Jerusalem), a.k.a. "Jerusalem pilgrim(s)/pilgrimage road"
- Pilgrim's Road from Ballycumber to Clonmacnoise monastic site
- Camino de Santiago
