= Stone of Claims =

Raised stone platform in Jerusalem mentioned in the Talmud

The Stone of Claims (Hebrew: אבן הטועין in the Bavli, אבן הטועים in the Mishna and Yerushalmi) (Even Hato'eem/n), also known as the Stone of Losses or Stone of Strayers, was a raised stone platform in Jerusalem mentioned in the Talmud.

== History ==
According to the Talmud, the stone of claims was a public platform that existed in Jerusalem during the Second Temple period:

Our Rabbis taught: There was a Stone of Claims in Jerusalem: whoever lost an article repaired thither, and whoever found an article did likewise. The latter stood and proclaimed, and the former submitted his identification marks and received it back. And in reference to this we learnt (Taanit 19a): Go forth and see whether the Stone of Claims is covered.

— Bava Metzia 28:B.

In 2015, archaeologists discovered a 2,000-year-old pyramid-shaped staircase built of large ashlar stones on an ancient street in the City of David. Some scholars have suggested it might be the ancient Stone of Claims. The podium was found on the main street leading from the Siloam Pool to the Temple Mount.

Two British archaeologists who unearthed part of the step pyramid about a century ago thought it was a staircase leading to a house.

== Literature ==
At the Stone of Losses is a book of poetry by T. Carmi.

== See also ==
- Archaeology of Israel
- Jerusalem stone
- Temple in Jerusalem
- Lost and found
