= Stepped street (Jerusalem) =

Roman period street in Jerusalem

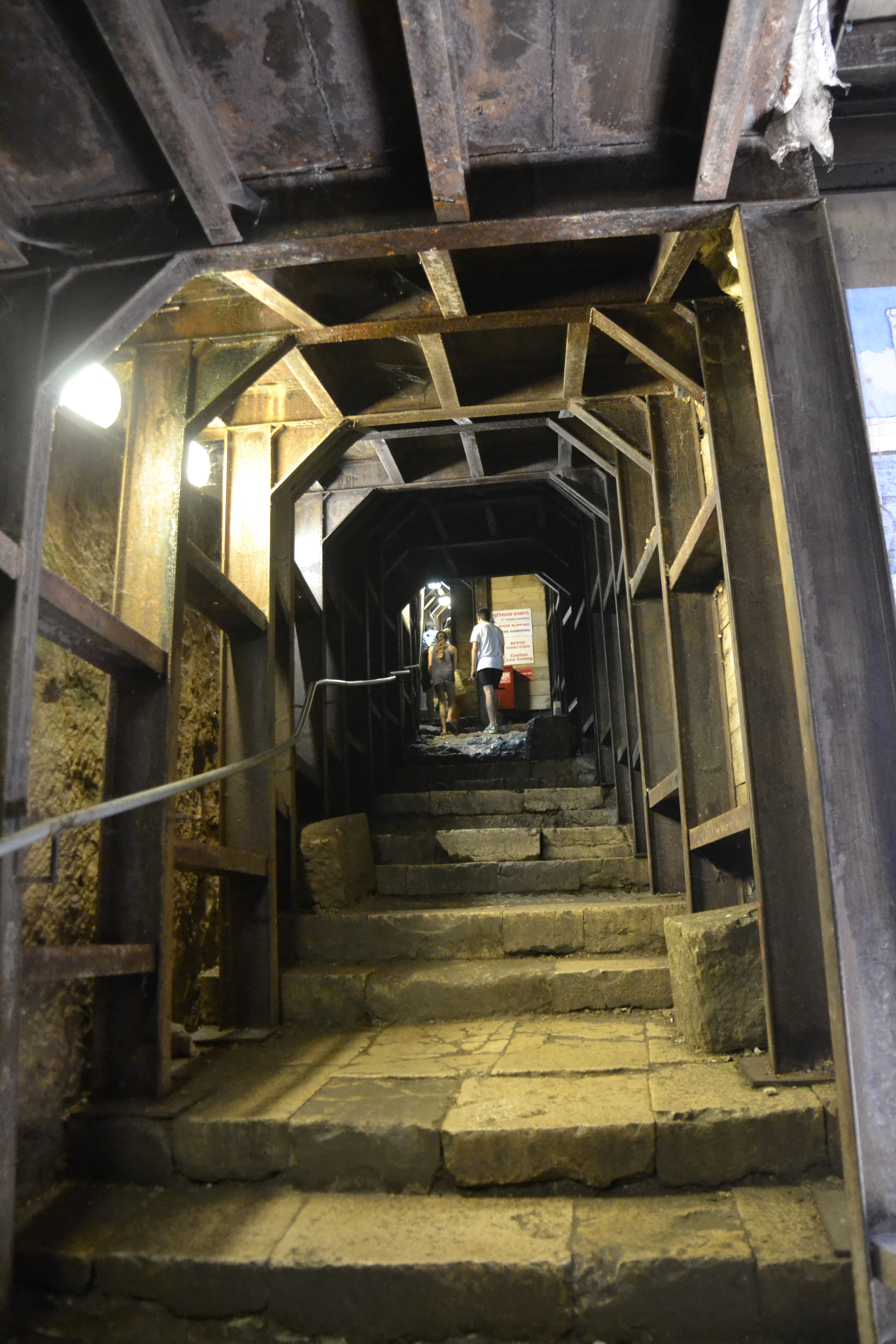
The street ascending toward the Temple Mount

The stepped street, as it is known from academic works, or the Jerusalem pilgrim road as it has been dubbed by the Ir David Foundation, is the early Roman period street connecting the Temple Mount from its southwestern corner, to Jerusalem's southern gates of the time via the Pool of Siloam. The stepped street was built at the earliest during the 30s CE, with the latest coin found under the pavement dating to 30–31 CE, during the governorship of Pontius Pilate of New Testament fame. The street is part of the City of David archaeological park located in the Jerusalem Walls National Park in East Jerusalem. While the area has been referred to as Mount Ophel or the City of David by archaeologists and tourists, it is commonly referred to as the Wadi Hilweh area of Silwan by local residents.

== Description ==
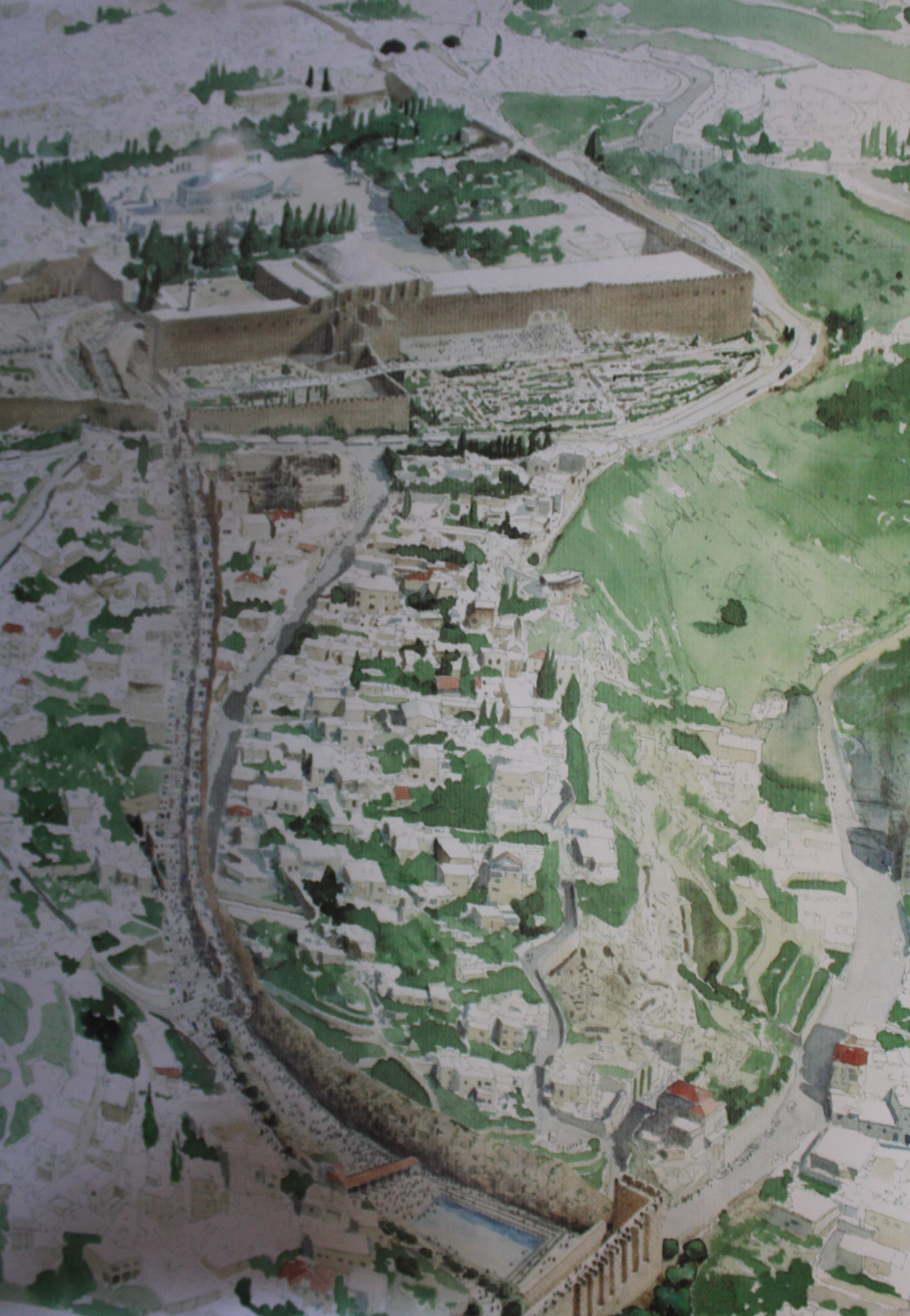
Idealized representation of the route from the Pool of Siloam to the Temple Mount

The street ascended from Jerusalem's southern gates, along the ancient City of David, today part of the Palestinian neighborhood of Silwan, into what is now the Old City and passed by the Western Wall after passing underneath the Herodian bridge now known as Robinson's Arch. The ancient path was improved and paved in large, well-cut stone in the pattern of two steps followed by a long landing, followed by two more steps and another landing. The street was eight meters wide and its length from the Pool of Siloam to the Temple Mount is 600 meters.

The large drainage channel which ran below the street has also been excavated and made partially accessible to visitors.

== Archaeological exploration history ==
Sections of the ancient street were first discovered by Charles Warren in 1884, followed by Frederick J. Bliss and Archibald C. Dickey of the Palestine Exploration Fund between 1894 and 1897. The find was reburied when their excavation concluded. Other sections were uncovered, then reburied, by later archaeologists, Jones in 1937 and Kathleen Kenyon in 1961–1967. More details about the street were published by Benjamin Mazar in 1969–1971, followed by Ronny Reich (alone or in collaboration with Yakov Billig, then Eli Shukron) between 1999 and 2011 (including findings from the drainage channel running beneath the street), and Eilat Mazar in 2000.

The street was re-excavated during excavations on a water channel from the Second Temple period.

== Reception ==
The Israel Antiquities Authority performed the excavation beneath existing homes using a technique called horizontal excavation. According to American archaeologist Jodi Magness, “Methodologically, the problem of using a horizontal or tunnel excavation in archaeology is that it doesn’t allow you to see the full context of the remains. Archaeology is all about context, but by digging in this way, you divorce the remains that you excavate from the remains that are above them and around them and that is problematic from an archaeological point of view.” When asked about the criticism, archaeologist Ari Levy said technology has allowed the archaeologists to overcome many of the obstacles of the excavation, noting that they can't just remove the neighbors’ houses.

The Ir David Foundation, also known as Elad, is a settler organisation that leads excavations in the locale. Archaeologists from the Israel Antiquities Authority spent twenty years excavating the site. The non-governmental organisation Emek Shaveh has characterised the archaeological work initiated by Elad an "attempt to redefine the area solely as an ancient site, and not as a Palestinian residential neighborhood". In 2019 Elad opened a portion of the road with David M. Friedman, the United States Ambassador to Israel, giving a keynote. According to David M. Halbfinger in New York Times the ambassador's presence at a public event in East Jerusalem was unusual as ambassadors typically try to "avoid being seen as taking Israel's side in the conflict with the Palestinians".

United States Secretary of State Marco Rubio and United States ambassador to Israel Mike Huckabee were both present at the inauguration of the site in 2025. Rubio's visit was criticized by Palestinians and their supporters as endorsing Israeli control and actions in the area. Ze’ev Orenstein, director of international affairs at the City of David, stated that “All the archeological excavations are carried out by the Israel Antiquities Authority according to the highest standards.”

== Interpretation ==
According to archaeologist Ronny Reich, who for several years led the dig uncovering the ancient street together with archaeologist Eli Shukron, pilgrims used the Pool of Siloam as a mikveh for ritual purification before walking up the street to the Temple. However, Yoel Elitzur opposes this interpretation and argues that the Pool of Siloam was a typical Roman public swimming pool.

In ancient times, in the celebration called Simchat Beit HaShoeivah, water was carried up from the Pool of Siloam to the Temple. There are attempts to connect the Roman-period street to this festival.

== See also ==
- Excavations at the Temple Mount
- Givati Parking Lot dig
