= Ronny Reich =

Israeli archaeologist (born 1947)

- רוני רייך
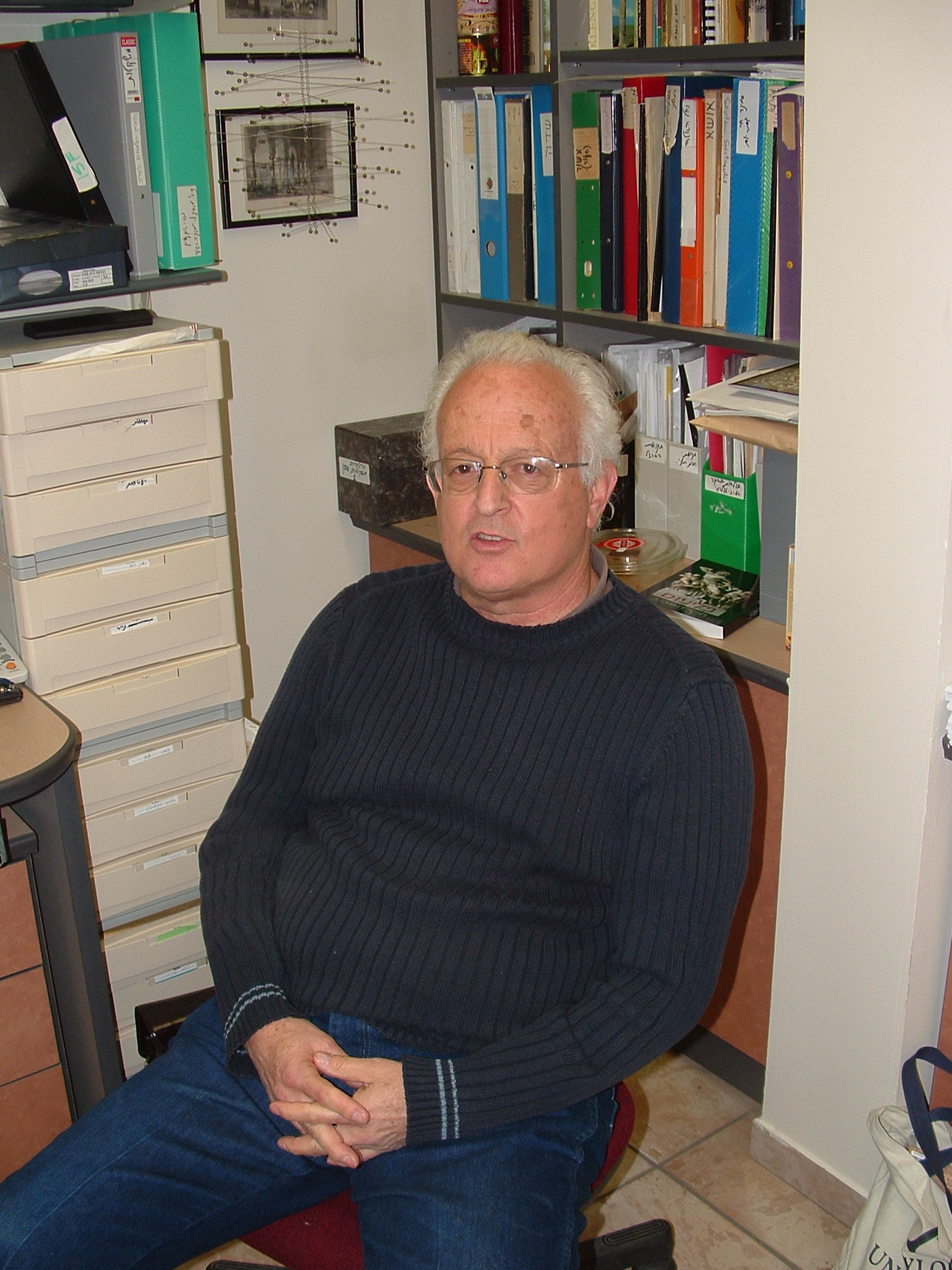
- Born: March 31, 1947 (age 79); Rehovot, Israel
- Education: Hebrew University of Jerusalem
- Known for: Jerusalem archaeological excavation, Miqwa'ot study
- Awards: Jerusalem Prize for Archaeology 2000
- Scientific career
- Fields: Archaeology
- Workplaces: Department of Archaeology at University of Haifa
- Doctoral advisor: Nahman Avigad, Lee I. Levine

Ronny Reich (Hebrew: רוני רייך; born 1947) is an Israeli archaeologist, excavator and scholar of the ancient remains of Jerusalem.

== Education ==
Reich studied archaeology and geography at the Hebrew University of Jerusalem. His MA thesis (supervised by Prof. Yigael Yadin) dealt with Assyrian architecture in Palestine (the Land of Israel), about which he later published several articles (concerning Ayelet HaShahar, Tel Hazor, the "Sealed Karum of Egypt", Beth-Zur, Tell Jemme, Ramat Rachel, Tel Megiddo and Buseira).

His participation in excavations in the Jewish Quarter of the Old City of Jerusalem, carried out between 1969 and 1978 and directed by Nahman Avigad, caused a shift in his scientific interests, from the Iron Age to the Early Roman period. He completed his Ph.D. thesis, "Miqva'ot (Jewish Ritual Baths) in Eretz Israel in the Second Temple and the Mishnah and Talmud periods", in 1990 under the supervision of Nachman Avigad and Lee I. Levine. The thesis is based on discoveries made during these digs.

== Employment ==
Between 1978 and 1995 Reich worked for the Israel Department of Antiquities and Museums (IDAM) as director of its scientific archives. In 1978 (before PCs were extant) he started the process of archiving archaeological information on the mainframe of the Ministry of Education and Culture. The first files he documented were of declared archaeological sites and lists of excavations. In 1986 he briefly served as the District Archaeologist of Israel's Central District. When Amir Drori took office as director general of IDAM, Reich assisted him in turning the department into an independent governmental authority, the Israel Antiquities Authority (IAA).

== Excavations and main discoveries ==
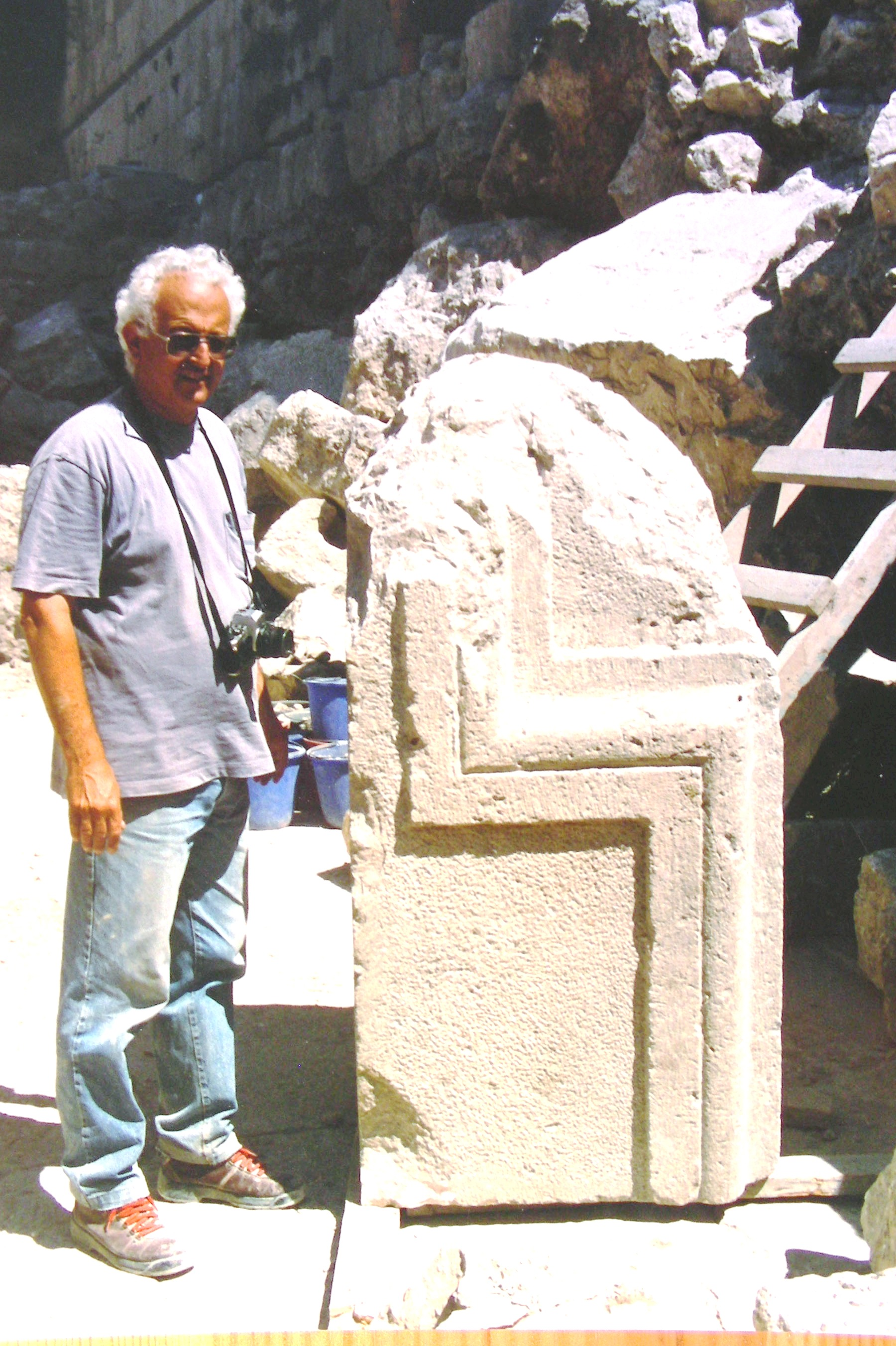
Professor Reich

In 1989 Reich returned to archaeological field work, carried out at various Jerusalem sites:

- Burials from the late Iron Age/Israelite period and the Byzantine period in Mamillah, located just outside Jaffa Gate. This excavation unearthed a mass grave of the Christian Byzantine population massacred during the Sassanid sack of Jerusalem in 614. Other discoveries include an extramural complex of Byzantine buildings with a thermae, and a segment of the western city wall from the Ayyubid period.
- Between 1994 and 1996, in collaboration with Yakov Billig, Reich exposed a long segment of the stone paved road along the western wall of the Herodian Temple Mount, under Robinson's Arch. With Yuval Baruch, he exposed an area near the southern Temple Mount wall, east of the Hulda Gates.
- His possibly most important work is the ongoing excavations, begun in 1995 in collaboration with Eli Shukron, on the south-eastern hill of Jerusalem, identified as the City of David. On the south-western side of the hill the remains of a large stone-lined and stepped pool were exposed and identified as the Pool of Siloam. Nearby, a paved esplanade, a stepped street which ascends towards the Temple Mount and the main sewer under it, were unearthed, all from the Second Temple period (Early Roman).
- Of particular importance are Reich and Shukron's excavations near the spring identified with the biblical Gihon, on the eastern side of the City of David. Here, they uncovered additional elements of the water system known as "Warren's Shaft". The new discoveries were large elements, some constructed, some rock-cut. They offered a new understanding of how the Canaanite water system was created in the Middle Bronze II period (c. 18th-17th centuries BCE) and how it operated. These finds changed the common perception of how the system functioned, dominant from the initial discovery of the site in 1867 and up to 1995. The excavations have revealed that the spring was heavily fortified with a massive tower, constructed around it in the Middle Bronze Age II, and that Warren's Shaft itself was not part of the water system, certainly not an underground well, where water was drawn. Instead, they revealed a nearby element resembling a pool cut into the rock, where water was drawn.
- Another important discovery, near the Gihon spring, was a large waste heap. In a meticulous process of wet sifting, large amounts of non-epigraphic bullae (with graphic depictions but no script) and a huge amount of fish bones (Jerusalem is quite distant from the Mediterranean Sea; however, it is close to the Jordan River where 22 species of fish live) were discovered, dating to the late 9th – early 8th century BCE.

In 1995 Reich became a faculty member of the Department of Archaeology at the University of Haifa, teaching classical archaeology. He became associate professor in 2002 and full professor in 2006. Between 2002 and 2005 he served as the head of the department. Reich's lengthy activities in Jerusalem have made him a prominent scholar of the city's archaeology and history. For these contributions, he was awarded the 'Jerusalem Prize for Archaeology' by the City of Jerusalem in 2000. In 2012 he was awarded the Austrian Cross of Honor for Science and Art, Class I.

In addition to his two major fields of interest (ritual baths and the archaeology of Jerusalem), he studied various aspects of daily life in Judaea in the late Second Temple period. These included studies on spindle whorls, stone vessels, ossuaries, inscriptions, etc. Of particular importance is his study on the stone scale weights, which were in use particularly in Jerusalem.

Reich has faced scrutiny for his connection to the right-wing Elad association.

== Other activities ==
Reich's main hobby is translating and publishing treatises on ancient architecture and art, plays and poetry into Hebrew. His translation of Vitruvius' De architectura (1997) was considerably successful. He also published these translations:

- Andrea Palladio / I Quattro Libri dell'Architettura (2000);
- Jacopo Barozzi da Vignola / The Rules for the Five Orders of Architecture (2002);
- Ross King / Brunelleschi's Dome (2003);
- Louis-Hugues Vincent / Underground Jerusalem (2008);
- Pliny the Elder / Natural History (Books 33–37)(2009).
- Bertolt Brecht / Refugees' Talks (1996);
- Christian Morgenstern / Gallows Songs (2004);
- Herta Reich / Within Two Days, the flight of a young Austrian Jewish woman 1938-1944 (2009), directly related to his personal history.

== Decorations and awards ==
- 2000 Jerusalem Prize for Archaeology
- 2012 Austrian Cross of Honour for Science and Art, 1st class
