= Eli Shukron =

Israeli archaeologist

Eli Shukron (Hebrew: אלי שוקרון) is an Israeli archaeologist employed by the Israel Antiquities Authority. He has made several significant finds from the period of the Second Temple of Jerusalem.

In 2004, Shukron and archaeologist Ronny Reich excavated the Second Temple period Pool of Siloam. The find was formally announced on August 9, 2005. The pool was used for Jewish healing rituals and is cited in the New Testament as the site of a healing miracle of Jesus.

In 2007, Shukron and Reich excavated an ancient Jerusalem water channel that drained Jerusalem. Items discovered in the tunnel appear to confirm Josephus's account of Jews using the sewer as a refuge and escape from the burning city. Among the finds was a rare half-shekel coin, used to pay the Second Temple tax; only seven other such coins have been found in archeological digs.

In September 2009, Shukron and Reich uncovered the ancient Jerusalem pilgrim road. Limited sections are currently open to the public.

In May 2012, Shukron told the public, that archaeologists, while sifting through the debris from the excavation site City of David just south of the walls of the Old City of Jerusalem, found a shard from a bulla bearing the name of the city of Bethlehem. This is the first time that Bethlehem is mentioned outside the Bible from the period of the First Temple.

In May 2014, Shukron claimed to have discovered the legendary Citadel of David described in the Bible during his excavation of the ancient City of David in East Jerusalem.

In December 2022, it was announced that, together with Gershon Galil, he had discovered a summary inscription in the Siloam tunnel recording the deeds of Hezekiah, including the cutting of the tunnel, and giving the date it was completed. An extension of the Siloam inscription was also discovered.
