= Pool of Siloam =

Rock-cut pools in Jerusalem

Coordinates: 31°46′14″N 35°14′06″E

The term Pool of Siloam (Hebrew: בְּרֵכַת הַשִּׁילוֹחַ, romanized: Bərēḵaṯ hašŠilōaḥ, Levantine Arabic: بِرْكَة سِلْوَان, romanized: Birkat Silwān) refers to several rock-cut pools located southeast of the walls of the Old City of Jerusalem. The pools were fed by the waters of the Gihon Spring, carried there by the Siloam tunnel.

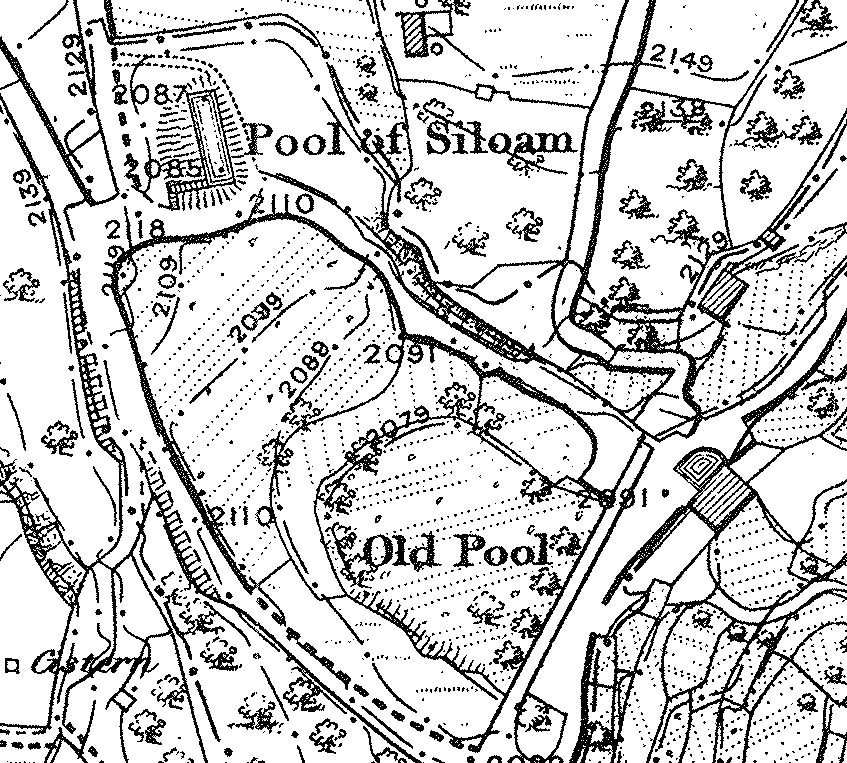
Ordnance Survey of Jerusalem

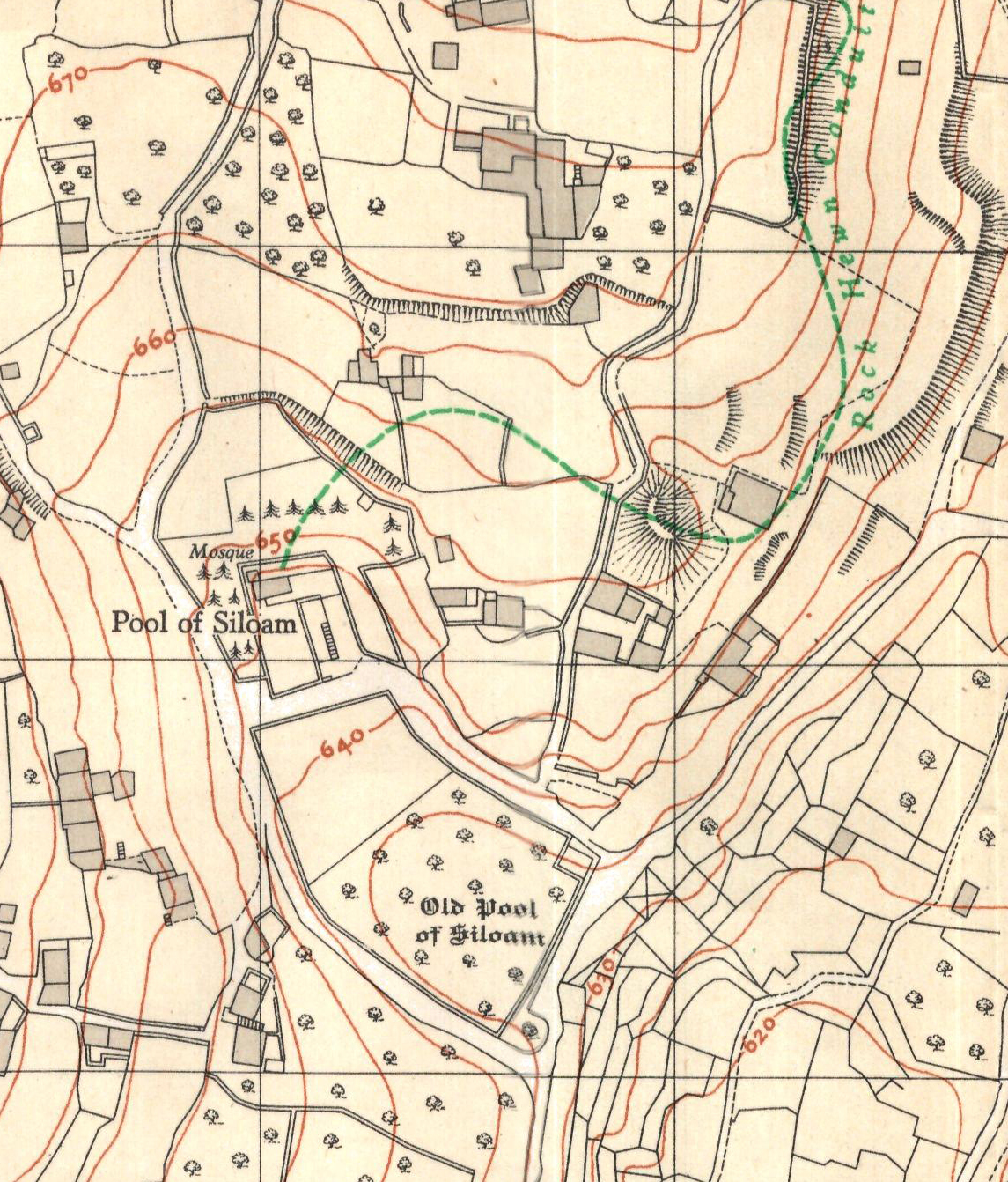
Survey of Palestine

The Pool of Siloam and Lower (Old) Pool

The Lower Pool or "Old Pool" (הַבְּרֵכָ֣ה הַיְשָׁנָ֑ה, according to Isaiah 22:11 (Note: For a description of which, see Pierotti, Ermete (1864), Jerusalem explored: being a description of the ancient and modern city, with numerous illustrations consisting of views, ground plans, and sections, London: Bell and Daldy; Cambridge: Deighton, Bell and Co., pp. 31, 187)) was historically known in Palestinian Arabic as Birket el-ḥamra "the Red Pool."

== History ==
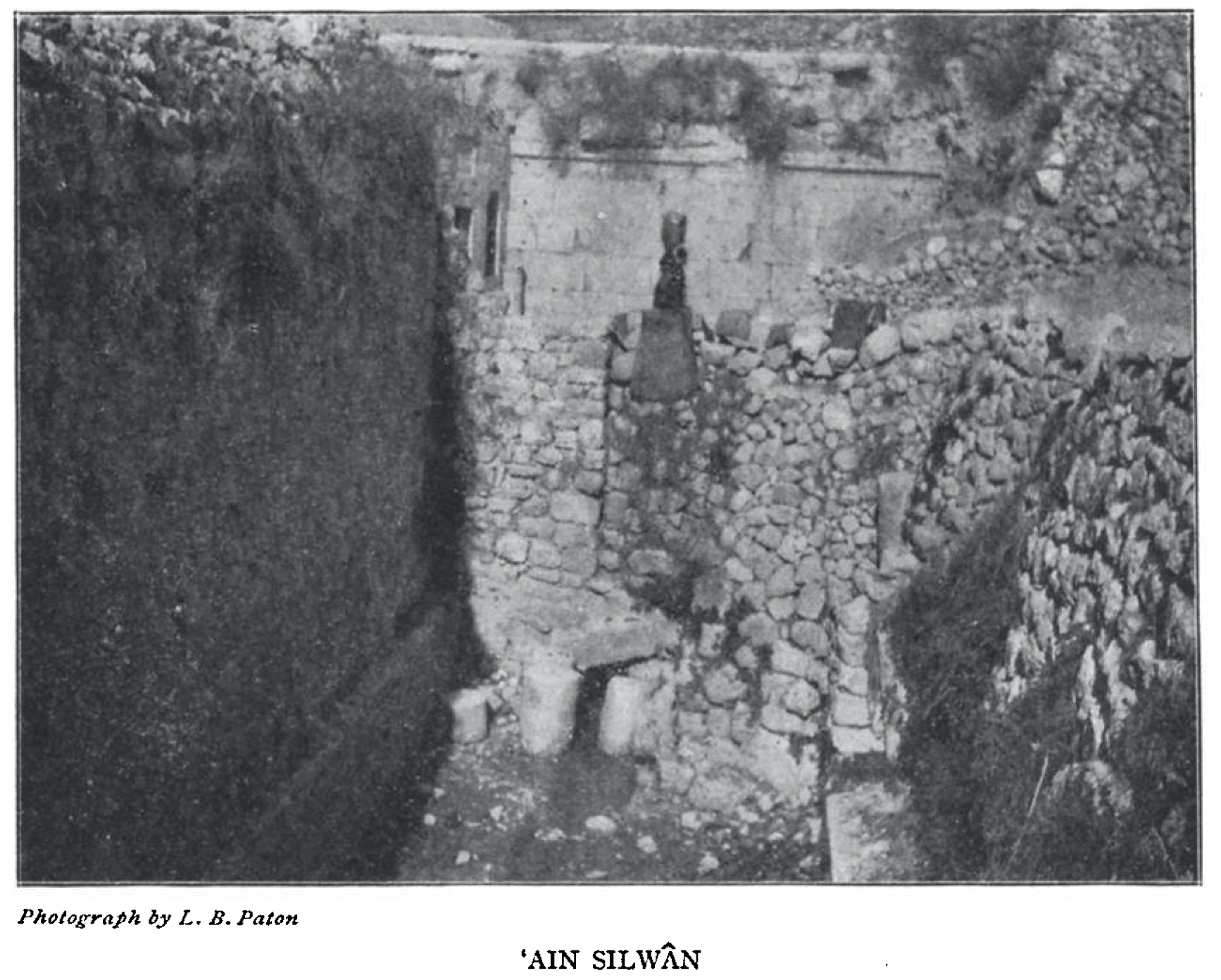
Ain Silwan

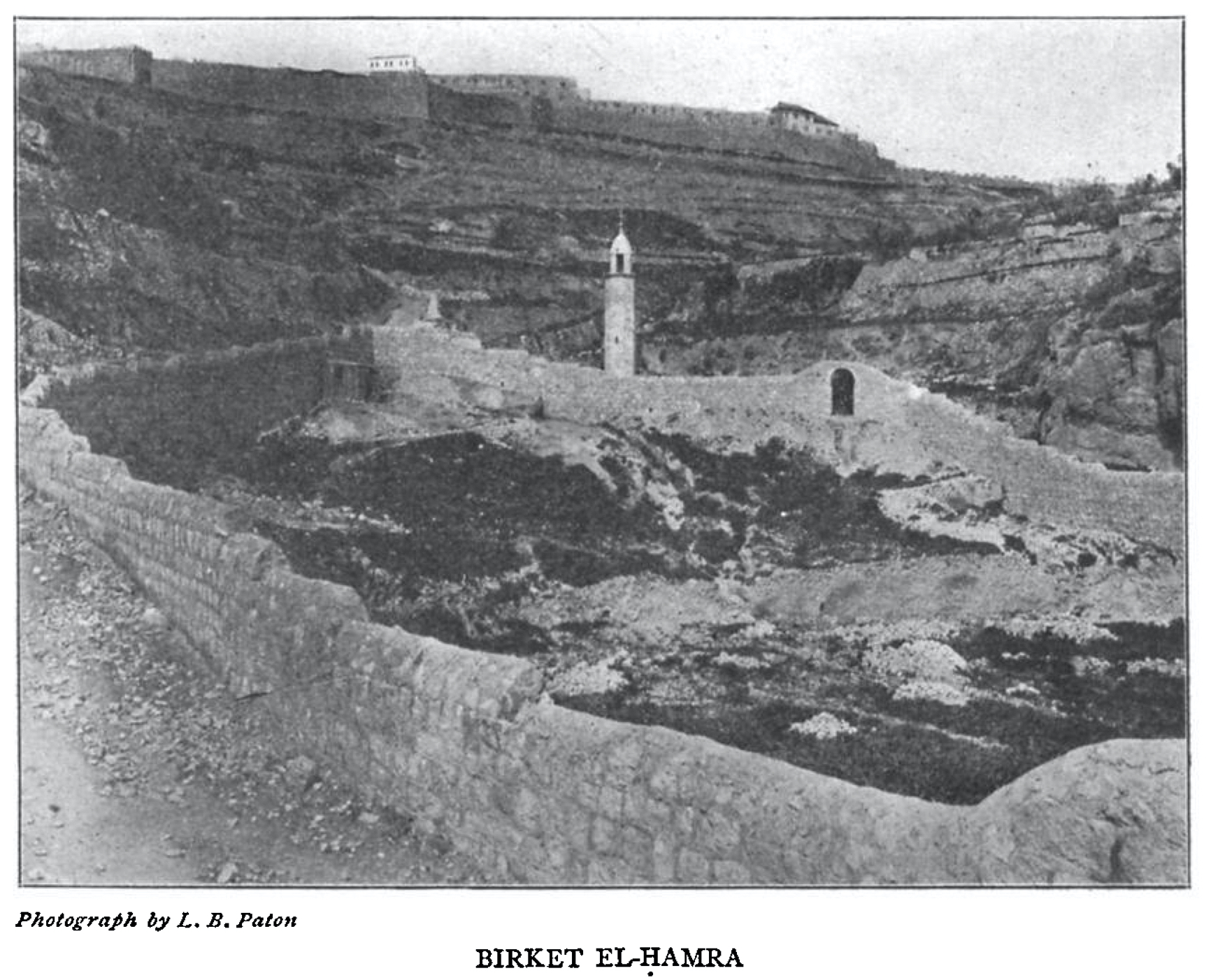
Birket Hamra

The pools in 1907

During the Second Temple period, the Pool of Siloam was centrally located in the Jerusalem suburb of Acra (Hebrew: חקרא), also known as the Lower City. Today, the Pool of Siloam is the lowest place in altitude within the historical city of Jerusalem, with an elevation of about 625 metres (2,051 ft) above sea level. The ascent from it unto the Temple Mount meant a gradient of 115 metres (377 ft) in altitude at a linear distance of about 634 metres (2,080 ft), with a mean elevation in the Temple Mount of 740 metres (2,430 ft) above sea level. According to the Jerusalem Talmud, Hagigah, the Pool of Siloam was the starting point for pilgrims who made the annual pilgrimage to Jerusalem, and where they ascended by foot to the inner court of the Temple Mount to bring an offertory to the Temple Court. The Pool of Siloam (perhaps referring to the Lower Pool) was used by pilgrims for ritual purification before visiting the Temple enclosure.

=== Hezekiah ===
The Pool of Siloam was built during the reign of Hezekiah (715–687/6 BCE) to leave besieging armies without access to the spring's waters. The newly constructed Siloam tunnel fed the pool. An older Canaanite tunnel had been vulnerable to attackers, so, under threat from the Assyrian king Sennacherib, Hezekiah sealed the old outlet of the Gihon Spring and built the new underground Siloam tunnel in place of the older tunnel (Books of Chronicles, 2 Chronicles 32:2–4).

During this period the Pool of Siloam was sometimes known as the Lower Pool according to Isaiah 22:9, as opposed to the more ancient Upper Pool mentioned in 2 Kings 18:17 and Isaiah 7:3 formerly fed by the older Canaanite tunnel.

=== Second Temple period ===
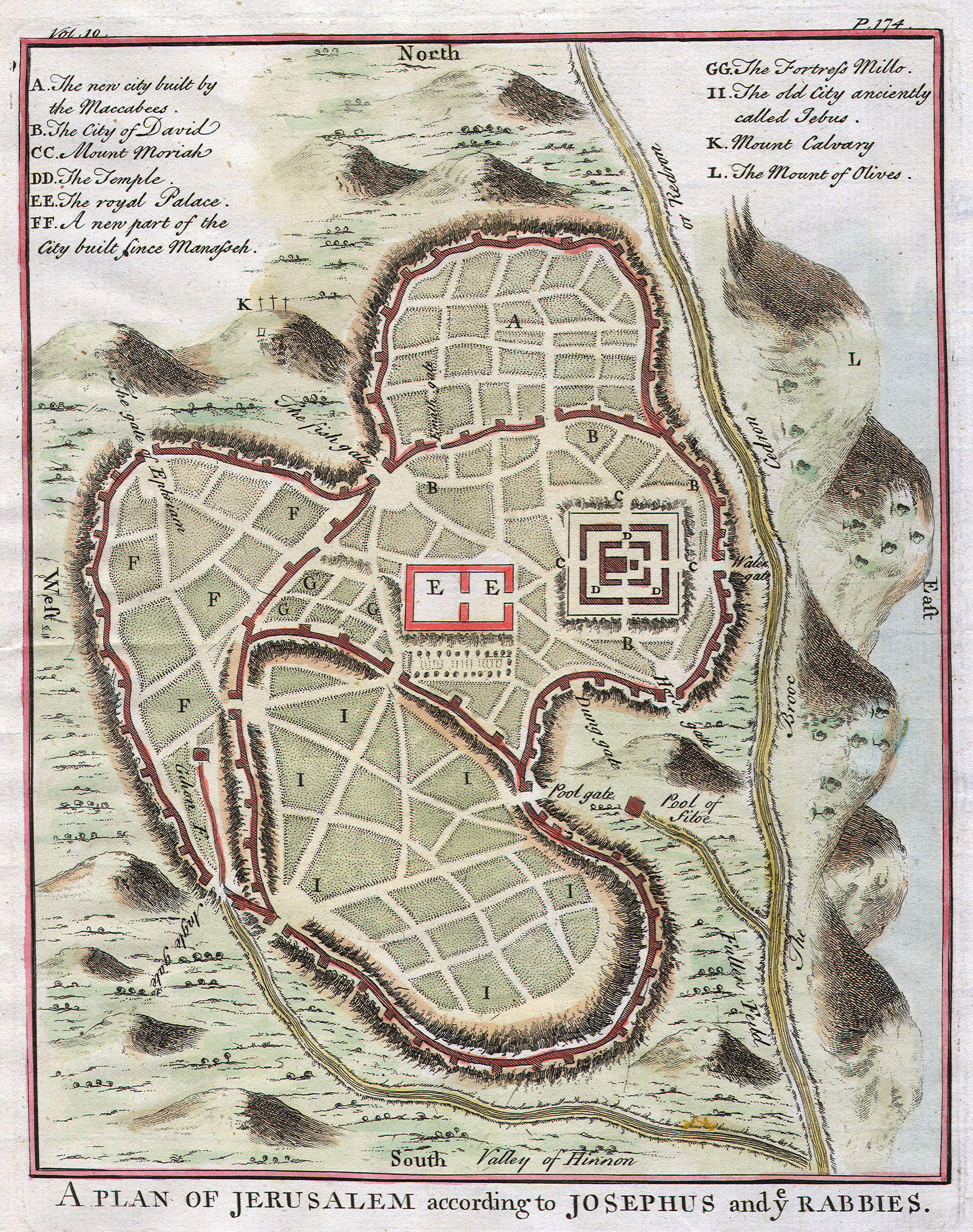
1730 map showing Jerusalem in Jesus' time, with the Pool of Siloam ("Siloe") outside the city wall at the lower right

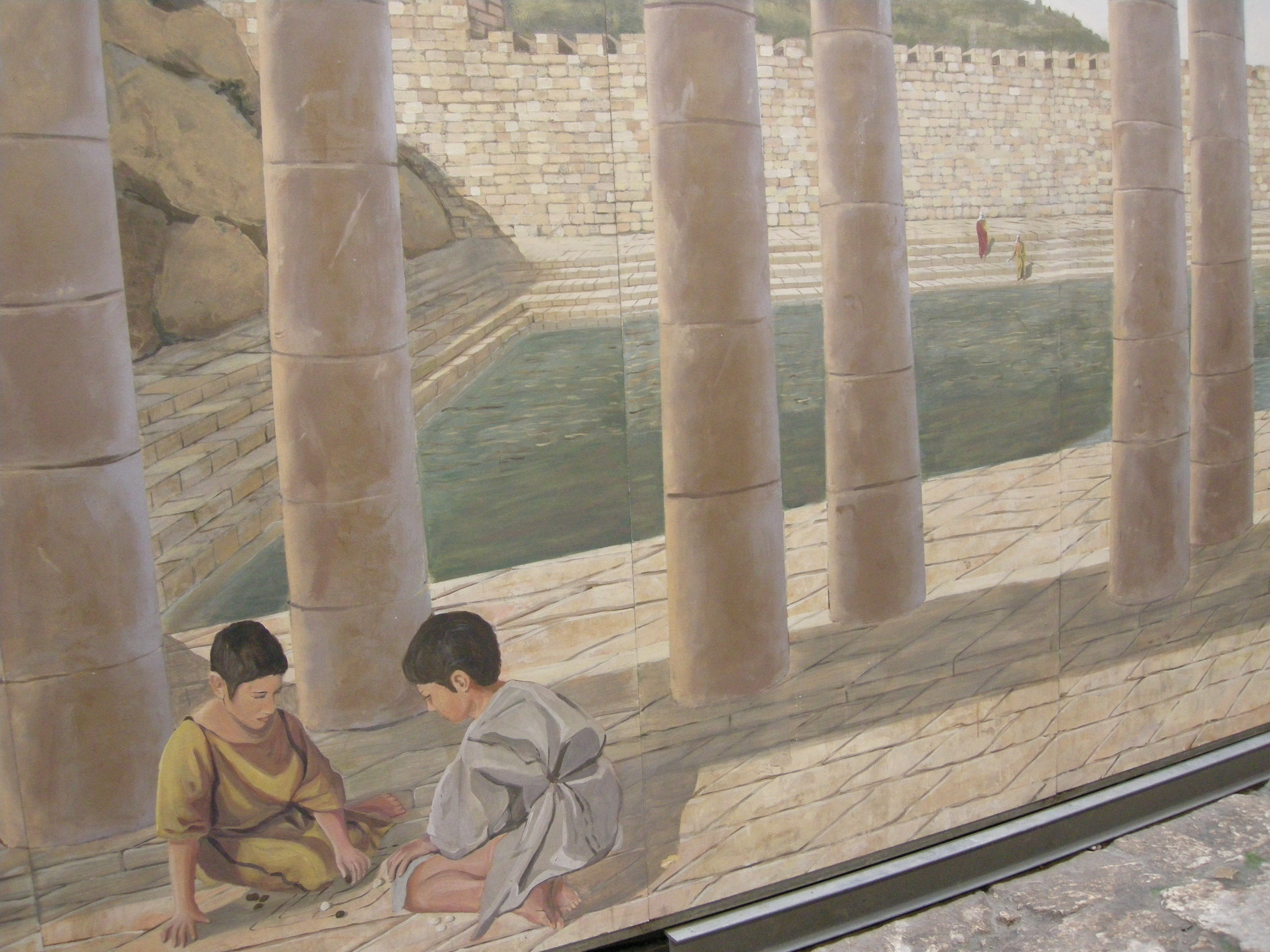
Artist's reconstruction of the pool in the Second Temple period

The pool was reconstructed no earlier than the reign of Alexander Jannaeus (103–76 BCE), although it is not clear whether this pool was in the same location as the earlier pool built by Hezekiah – if so, all traces of the earlier construction have been destroyed. The pool remained in use during the time of Jesus. According to the John 9, Jesus sent a man blind from birth to the pool to complete his healing. As a freshwater reservoir, the pool would have been a major gathering place for ancient Jews making religious pilgrimages to the city. Some scholars, influenced by Jesus commanding the blind man to wash in the pool, suggest that it was probably used as a mikvah (ritual bath).

The pool was destroyed and covered after the First Jewish–Roman War in 70 CE. Dating was indicated by several coins discovered on the stones of the patio near the pool to the north from the days of the War. The latest coin is dated "4 years to the day of the Great Revolt, " meaning 69 CE. In the years following the destruction, winter rains washed alluvia from the hills to the valley and down the slopes of Mount Zion to the west of the pool; the pool was filled with silt layers (up to 4m in some places) until it was covered completely.

=== Late Roman and Byzantine periods ===
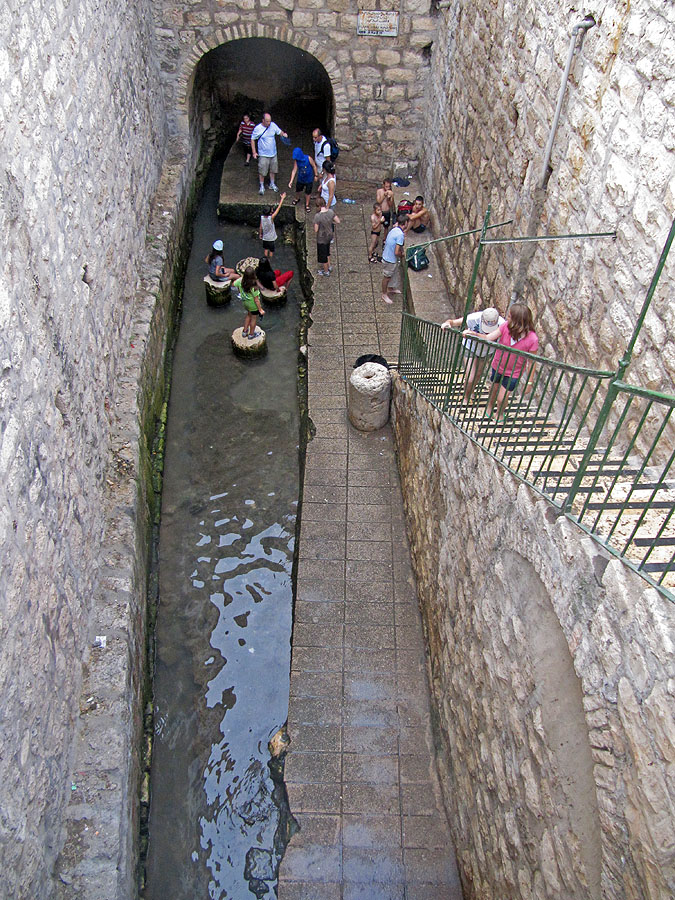
The Byzantine pool of Siloam

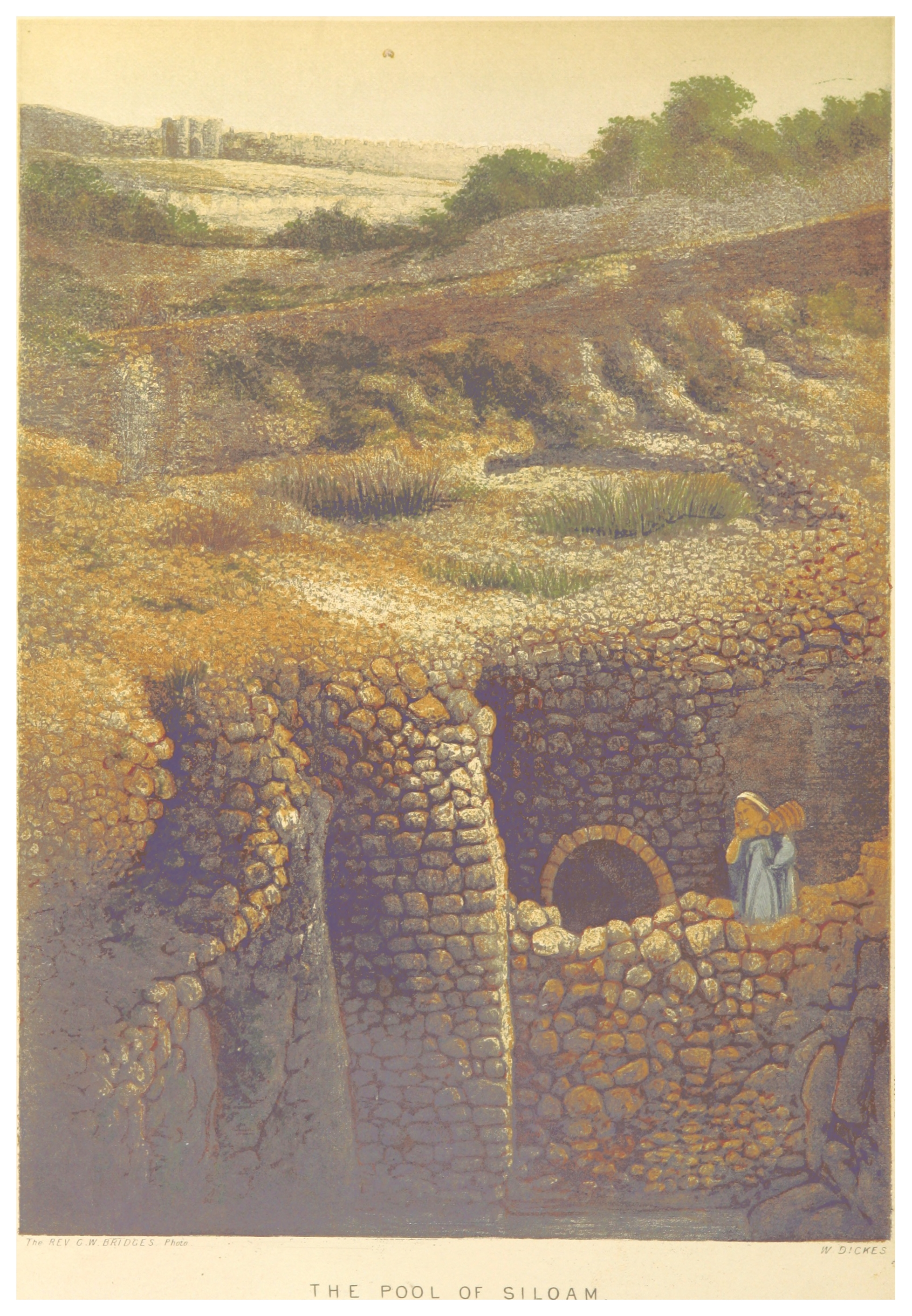
Handcolored photo of the site (c. 1865)

Roman sources mention a Shrine of the Four Nymphs (Tetranymphon), a nymphaeum built by Hadrian during the construction of Aelia Capitolina in the year 135 and mentioned in Byzantine works such as the 7th-century Chronicon Paschale; other nymphaea built by Hadrian, such as that at Sagalassos, are very similar. It is unlikely that this shrine was built on the site of the Second Temple Pool of Siloam, but it may have been a precursor to the Byzantine reconstruction.

In the 5th century, a pool was constructed at the end of the Siloam tunnel at the behest of Aelia Eudocia, empress consort of the Byzantine Empire. This pool survives today, surrounded by a high stone wall with an arched entrance to Hezekiah's Tunnel. The pool is around 70 yards (64 m) from the Second Temple period Lower Pool and is significantly smaller. Until the discovery of the Second Temple pool, this pool was wrongly thought to be the one described in the New Testament and Second Temple sources.

== Archaeological research ==
=== 19th and 20th centuries ===
Archaeologists excavating the site around the Pool of Siloam in the 1880s noted that there was a stairway of 34 rock-hewn steps to the west of the Pool of Siloam leading up from a court in front of the Pool of Siloam. The breadth of the steps varies from 27 ft (8.2 m) at the top to 22 ft (6.7 m) at the bottom.

The remnants of an ancient wall dating to the Bronze Age were unearthed near the older Pool of Siloam, known also as the "Lower Pool," and in Arabic as Birket al-Ḥamrah, during the excavations conducted by F. J. Bliss and A. C. Dickie (1894–1897). At the "Lower Pool" of Siloam there was a weir (levee), used to raise the level of water upstream or to regulate its flow. Conrad Schick's research in connection with a partially rock-hewn aqueduct related to the water system of Siloam has led researchers to conclude that the Lower Pool, Birket al-Ḥamrah, received water directly from the "Fountain of the Virgin" (Gihon Spring) at some period and which Schick places prior to the completion of the Siloam Tunnel.

=== 21st century ===
==== Second Temple period pool ====
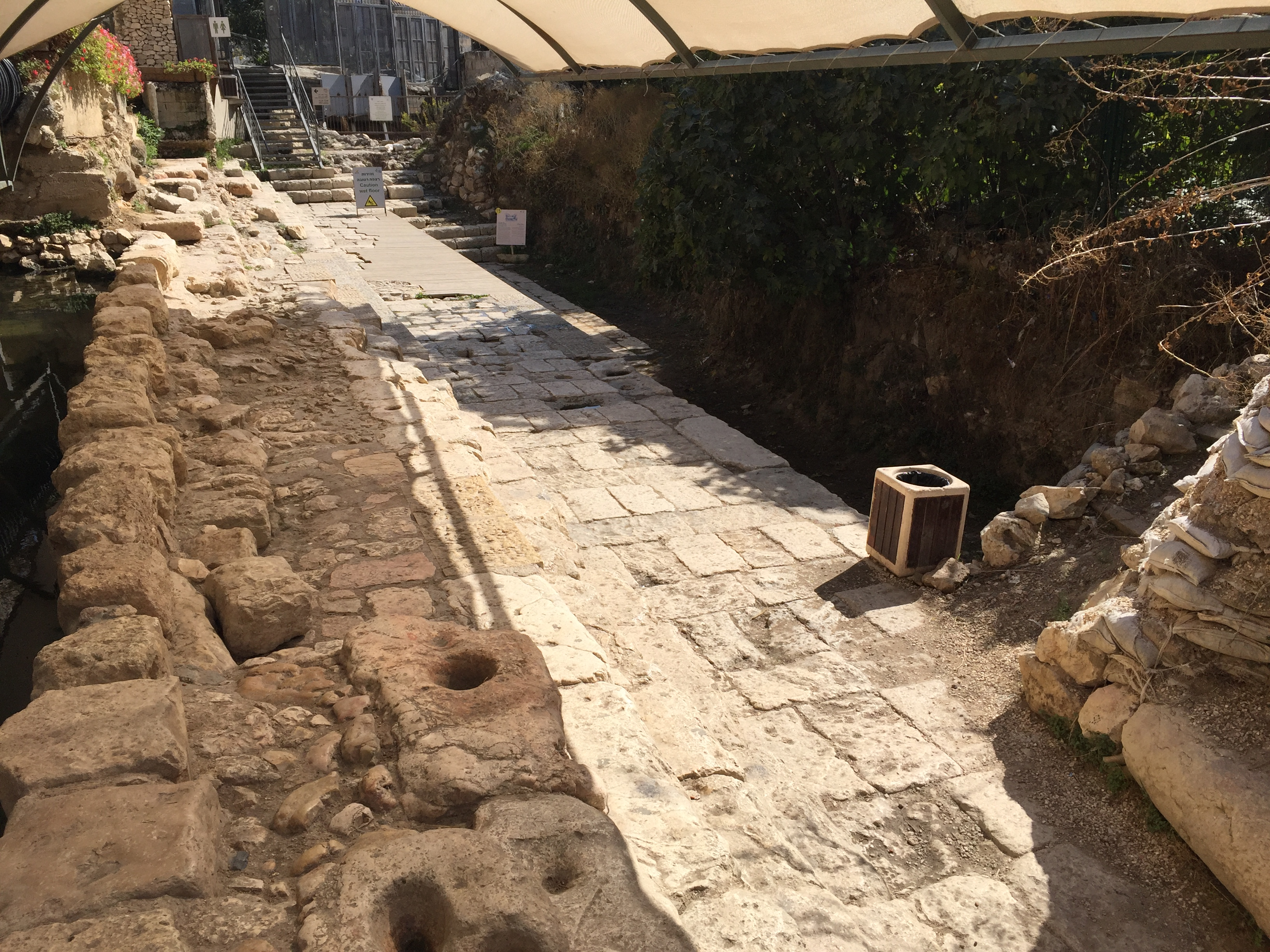
Remains of the Pool of Siloam from the Second Temple Period

The pool was rediscovered during an excavation work for a sewer in the autumn of 2004, by Ir David Foundation workers, following a request and directions given by archaeologists Eli Shukron accompanied by Ori Orbach from the Israel Nature and Parks Authority. Shukron and Ronny Reich (working with the Israel Antiquities Authority) uncovered stone steps, and it became obvious that these steps were likely to have been part of the Second Temple period pool. Excavations commenced and confirmed the initial supposition; the find was formally announced on August 9, 2005, and received substantial international media attention.

The excavations also revealed that the pool was 225 ft (69 m) wide, and that steps existed on at least three sides of the pool. The pool is not perfectly rectangular, but a soft trapezoid. There are three sets of five steps, two leading to a platform, before the bottom is reached, and it has been suggested that the steps were designed to accommodate various water levels. The pool is stone-lined, but underneath, there is evidence of an earlier version that was merely plastered (to help it retain water). Coins from the reign of Alexander Jannaeus were found embedded in the plaster lining of the pool, and therefore provide a secure earliest date for the pool's (re-)construction.

==== First Temple period pool ====
For almost two decades after the initial discovery, most of the pool remained unexcavated, as the land above was owned by a nearby Greek Orthodox church until 2004 (when it was sold to a Jewish development company), and was occupied by an orchard known as the King's Garden (compare Nehemiah 3:15). In late December 2022, the Israeli Supreme Court ordered the eviction of the tenants and turned ownership of the plot over to the City of David Foundation. Several months later, the Israel Antiquities Authority commenced a complete excavation of this plot in hopes of uncovering the remaining portion of the pool.

The initial excavations surprised archaeologists by uncovering scant additional remains from the pool, but continuing work discovered a dam of monumental size and unexpected complexity, at least 19 meters long, 11 meters high, and 10 meters wide, with partly vertical, partly slanting walls. Carbon dating organic material from the dam allowed dating it and the pool to roughly 800 BCE, at the time of King Jehoash of Judah. Archaeologists speculate that the pool may have been built to supply the city with water during times of climate change.

== See also ==
- Silwan
- Stone of Claims
- Tower of Siloam
- Pool of Bethesda
