= Jerusalem during the Iron Age =

- c. 1200 BCE – c. 587/6 CE
Jerusalem during the Bronze Age	Jerusalem during the Second Temple period
- Model of Jerusalem during the late 8th-century BCE, Bible Lands Museum
- Duration: c. 6 centuries
- Location: Jerusalem, Judea
- King: House of David
- Key events: Siege of Jebus; Assyrian siege of Jerusalem; Siege of Jerusalem (597 BC); Siege of Jerusalem (587 BC)

Jerusalem in the Iron Age is the history of Jerusalem from the 12th century BCE, through its centuries as the capital of the Kingdom of Judah under the Davidic dynasty, until its siege and destruction by Nebuchadnezzar II in c. 587/6 BCE. Over this period, Jerusalem grew from a small stronghold on the ridge above the Gihon Spring, known as the City of David, into a large state capital spread across several hills. The era from the construction of the First Temple (traditionally dated to the 10th century BCE) to the city's destruction is commonly called the First Temple period.

According to the Hebrew Bible, Jerusalem in the early Iron Age was a small enclave within Israelite territory, known as Jebus after its Jebusite inhabitants. Circa 1000 BCE, the city was conquered by David who made it the capital of his kingdom. According to the Bible, his son and successor Solomon built the First Temple. Few remains can be securely dated to the 10th century BCE; the Stepped Stone Structure and Large Stone Structure in the City of David have been dated anywhere from the 13th to the 9th century BCE. The archaeological record becomes much fuller in the following centuries. By the late-8th century, the city had reached the peak of its prosperity, growing to fourteen times the size of the earlier settlement. Building spread north across the Ophel toward the Temple Mount, down the eastern slope of the southeastern hill, and onto the southwestern hill, which was enclosed late by new fortifications, including the Broad Wall. The Siloam Tunnel, generally attributed to King Hezekiah, carried the spring's water to a pool inside the walls before the Assyrian siege of 701 BCE.

The city, diminished by the siege, recovered later in the 7th century BCE. Burned houses containing archives of clay bullae, administrative buildings, family rock-cut tombs in the surrounding hills, and fish bones brought from afar point to royal administration and commercial importance. In 597 BCE, Nebuchadnezzar II of Babylonia captured Jerusalem, and, after another revolt, besieged it again in 587/6 BCE. The city and the Temple were burned, many inhabitants were deported to Babylonia, and the city was left largely deserted. Later, after the fall of Babylon, Persian king Cyrus the Great permitted exiles to return, leading to the reconstruction of the Temple and the city's revival during the Second Temple period.

== Periodization ==
Scholars divide the Iron Age of the southern Levant into the Iron Age I (c. 1200–1000 BCE) and the Iron Age II, which is then subdivided. The subdivisions are contested, and the dispute bears directly on the city of Jerusalem. The Iron Age IIA, formerly dated c. 1000–900 BCE, is now placed by most archaeologists at c. 980/950 to 830/800 BCE, so pottery once assigned to the 10th century BCE may now belong to the 9th century BCE.

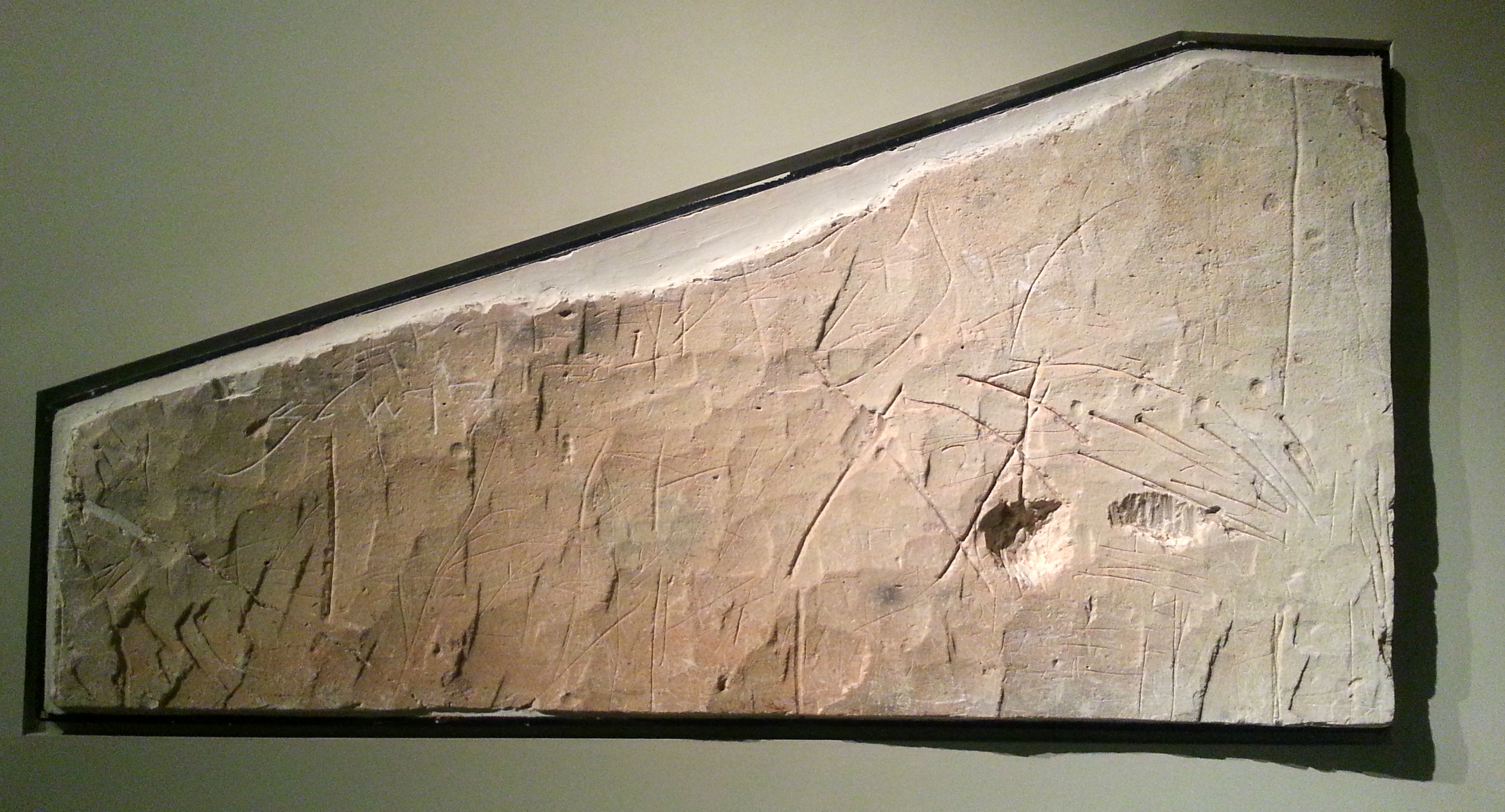
The name Jerusalem in Paleo-Hebrew script, from 8th-century BCE tomb graffiti at Khirbet Beit Lei; now in the Israel Museum

Scholars also use a political framework. The United Kingdom of Israel, under Saul, David and Solomon (conventionally 1005–928 BCE), the separate kingdoms of Israel and Judah until the fall of Israel (c. 722 BCE), and Judah alone until its destruction. Jodi Magness's book on Jerusalem, for example, features chapters on "Jebusite Jerusalem" (before 1050 BCE), "Israelite Jerusalem" (1050–930 BCE) and "Judahite Jerusalem" (930–587 BCE).

== History ==
=== Background ===
The southeastern hill which would later become known as the City of David was settled at the beginning of the Early Bronze Age, about 3500 BCE, by people who built houses on the bedrock slope above the Gihon Spring and farmed the Kidron Valley. The earliest probable references to the city are in Egyptian Execration texts of the 19th and 18th centuries BCE, which name a town in Canaan rendered Rushalimum; the preserved names of its leaders are Semitic. In the mid-14th century BCE, the chieftain of Urusalim, Abdi-Heba, sent the pharaohs letters preserved among the Amarna letters, in which he complained about neighboring rulers and the Habiru, and asked for Egyptian military intervention. The texts suggest a city-state of some importance, though the settlement was relatively small, covering less than 11 acres (4.5 ha) on the ridge's eastern slope. Its Middle Bronze Age population is estimated at around 1,000 inhabitants.

=== Jebus ===
Around 1200 BCE, the Bronze Age collapse brought an end to many major polities of the eastern Mediterranean and saw population movements; this is also when the Israelites were first attested as a people settling the central highlands of the southern Levant. The Hebrew Bible describes Jerusalem during this period as Jebus (Hebrew: יבוס), a city of a people called the Jebusites, which remained a foreign enclave among the Israelite tribes until it was conquered by David. The origins of the Jebusites, who are known only from the Bible, is unclear. The origins of the Jebusites, who are known only from the Bible, are unclear. Some scholars connect them with the Hittites, based on the description of Jerusalem's parentage as Amorite and Hittite in Ezekiel 16, the presence of Uriah the Hittite among David's warriors, and the possibly Hittite or Hurrian origins of the name of Araunah the Jebusite. They may have arrived during the upheavals of the 12th century.

=== Under David and Solomon ===
According to 2 Samuel 5, David, a man of the Tribe of Judah who rose to become the king of the United Kingdom of Israel, captured "the stronghold of Zion" from the Jebusites and named it the City of David. The account mentions a tsinnor (צִנּוּר) by which his warriors reached the city. The Hebrew word occurs nowhere else with this sense; in modern Hebrew it means pipe or gutter, a use attested in antiquity in Psalms. The tsinnor used in the siege has been identified either with Warren's Shaft or with the water system around the Gihon Spring more generally, as Ronny Reich proposed. Kay Prag identified it with a natural fissure in the rock beneath the Stepped Stone Structure, whereas Dan Bahat identified it with an implement or with a musical instrument used to ward off enemies.

David made the city his kingdom's capital. Scholars have linked this choice to Jerusalem's central, neutral location outside the territory of any single Israelite tribe. David is also described as establishing Jerusalem as the kingdom's religious center by bringing the Ark of the Covenant there and setting up an altar on a threshing floor purchased from Araunah the Jebusite. The Books of Chronicles, which refers to Araunah as Ornan, identifies this site with Mount Moriah (later, the Temple Mount), the future site of the First Temple.

Solomon, David's son and successor, is credited with extending the city north onto the Temple Mount, where he built the temple and his palace. He is also said to have built the city wall and the Millo (הַמִּלּוֹא). Hillel Geva, who describes his own position as "minimalistic," estimates that Jerusalem had a population of approximately 2,000 during Solomon's reign.

Scholarly opinion on the United Monarchy's size and nature varies widely. The Tel Dan stele, discovered in 1993–1994, refers to a king of the "House of David" in the mid-9th century BCE, indicating that the kings of Judah traced their dynasty to David approximately a century after his traditional dating and supporting the view that he was a historical figure. Consequently, scholars generally accept that the kingdom of David and Solomon existed, but debate the extent of its territory and the degree to which the biblical account reflects historical reality.

=== Capital of Judah ===
According to the biblical account, after Solomon's death around 928 BCE, the kingdom divided into Israel in the north and Judah in the south, with Jerusalem serving as the capital of Judah. The border lay only about 15 kilometres (9.3 mi) north of the city. The First Temple gave Judah control of the principal center of the cult of the God of Israel and its revenues, which, according to the biblical account, led Jeroboam of Israel to set up rival sanctuaries at Dan and Bethel. By the 9th century, a residential quarter had grown up outside the walls at the foot of the eastern slope.

In the 8th century BCE, the Kingdom of Israel was conquered by the expanding Assyrian Empire, finally falling after the siege of Samaria in 722 BCE. The Assyrians deported a significant portion of Israel's population, replacing them with foreign settlers. In that century, Jerusalem spread onto the southwestern hill, possibly the biblical Mishneh, "Second Quarter". (Note: Archaeologist Nahman Avigad identified the southwestern hill as the Mishneh (the "Second Quarter"), a biblical suburb noted as the residence of the prophetess Huldah (2 Kings 22:14; Nehemiah 11:9). Avigad also connected the Makhtesh (the "Mortar"), a location mentioned alongside the Mishneh by the 7th-century prophet Zephaniah (Zephaniah 1:10–11), to the slopes of the Tyropoeon Valley.) Many archaeologists attribute this growth to refugees from northern Israel, while others give more weight to internal growth and to immigration encouraged by security and prosperity under Assyrian hegemony. An urban expansion occurred by the late 8th century BCE, bringing the total area within the city walls to around 650 dunams (160.5 acres), an area fourteen times larger than the Bronze and Early Iron Age city. According to Hillel Geva, 7,000−8,000 people lived in Jerusalem in the late 8th century BCE. Many scholars consider this era as the peak of splendor for Iron Age Jerusalem.

An earthquake during Uzziah's reign in the mid-8th century BCE, recalled in the contemporary Book of Amos (1:1) and two centuries later in Zechariah (14:5), has been identified through the collapse of a house above the Gihon Spring.

=== Hezekiah and the Assyrian siege ===
Between 727 and 698 BCE, King Hezekiah ruled Judah as an Assyrian vassal. He is presented by the biblical authors as a reformer who suppressed cults other than that of the God of Israel and centralized worship in the Jerusalem Temple.

In 705 BCE, following the death of King Sargon II, Hezekiah launched a rebellion against Assyria. In preparation, he fortified the suburbs that had grown up outside the walls and provided the city with a new water supply. In 701 BCE, the army of King Sennacherib devastated the countryside of Judah and destroyed Lachish, the kingdom's most important city after the capital. Jerusalem was besieged but not taken, for reasons that remain unclear, and Judah survived as a diminished vassal, paying a heavy indemnity and annual tribute and losing territory.

=== 7th century BCE ===
Between 698 and 642 BCE, Judah prospered under Assyrian vassalage during the reign of Manasseh, its longest-ruling king. The biblical writers condemn him for restoring localized sanctuaries and other cults, and the Deuteronomistic history blames him above all for the eventual destruction.

His grandson Josiah, who came to the throne in 639 BCE, is portrayed in the Bible as an ideal king. In 622 BCE, according to 2 Kings 22–23, a "book of the law", commonly identified with the Book of Deuteronomy (or an early form of it), was found in the Jerusalem Temple. This prompted the so-called "Deuteronomistic reform" that centralized worship in Jerusalem, removed the cults of Baal, Asherah, and the heavenly bodies from the Temple, and desecrated the "high places" elsewhere in the kingdom. In 609 BCE, Josiah was killed at Megiddo in a clash with Pharaoh Necho II, who was marching north to support the failing Assyrians against the Babylonians.

=== Babylonian conquest and destrution ===
After the fall of the Assyrian Empire, Judah was caught between Egypt and the rising Neo-Babylonian Empire. The prophet Jeremiah urged submission to Babylonia. In 597 BCE, after Judah's king Jehoiakim rebelled, the Babylonians besieged and took the city. His successor, Jeconiah, surrendered and was deported with the royal household and much of the elite, including the prophet Ezekiel. Nebuchadnezzar installed Jeconiah's uncle Zedekiah as a vassal king.

About a decade later, Zedekiah joined a revolt against Babylon, encouraged by Egypt. Jerusalem fell in 587/6 BCE after a siege of about eighteen months. According to 2 Kings 25, the Babylonian commander Nebuzaradan burned the Temple, the royal palace, and the city’s houses, and tore down its walls. Zedekiah was captured near Jericho, forced to watch the execution of his sons, then blinded and taken to Babylon.

Unlike the Assyrians, the Babylonians did not settle other populations in Judah, and Jerusalem and its surroundings remained largely depopulated. The Babylonians appointed Gedaliah as governor at Mizpah, north of Jerusalem, but he was assassinated by Ishmael son of Nethaniah, and some of the remaining population fled to Egypt. The destruction is attested by burned buildings filled with collapse, smashed storage jars, bullae baked in the fire, and arrowheads at the foot of a tower on the southwestern hill. Jewish tradition commemorates the destruction of the First Temple on the Ninth of Av, the same date on which the destruction of the Second Temple in 70 CE.

== Archaeology ==
=== Stepped Stone Structure ===
Stepped Stone Structure

On the southeastern hill of ancient Jerusalem, identified with the City of David, a massive stepped stone structure was partially exposed in the early 20th century and interpreted by its excavators as a buttress supporting a fortification above, leading them to name it the "Jebusite Ramp." Most archaeologists regard the structure as a single unit, built either in the 12th or 10th century BCE to support a substantial complex above it. Some scholars identify this overlying area with the "stronghold of Zion", and possibly with the Millo that later kings are said to have repaired or strengthened. Houses built directly on top of the stepped structure, destroyed in the Babylonian conquest, show that the structure had already gone out of use by the time they were built, but specialists disagree over the dating evidence for both the houses and the stepped structure itself, so whether it should be attributed to the Jebusites or to David remains unresolved.

=== Large Stone Structure ===
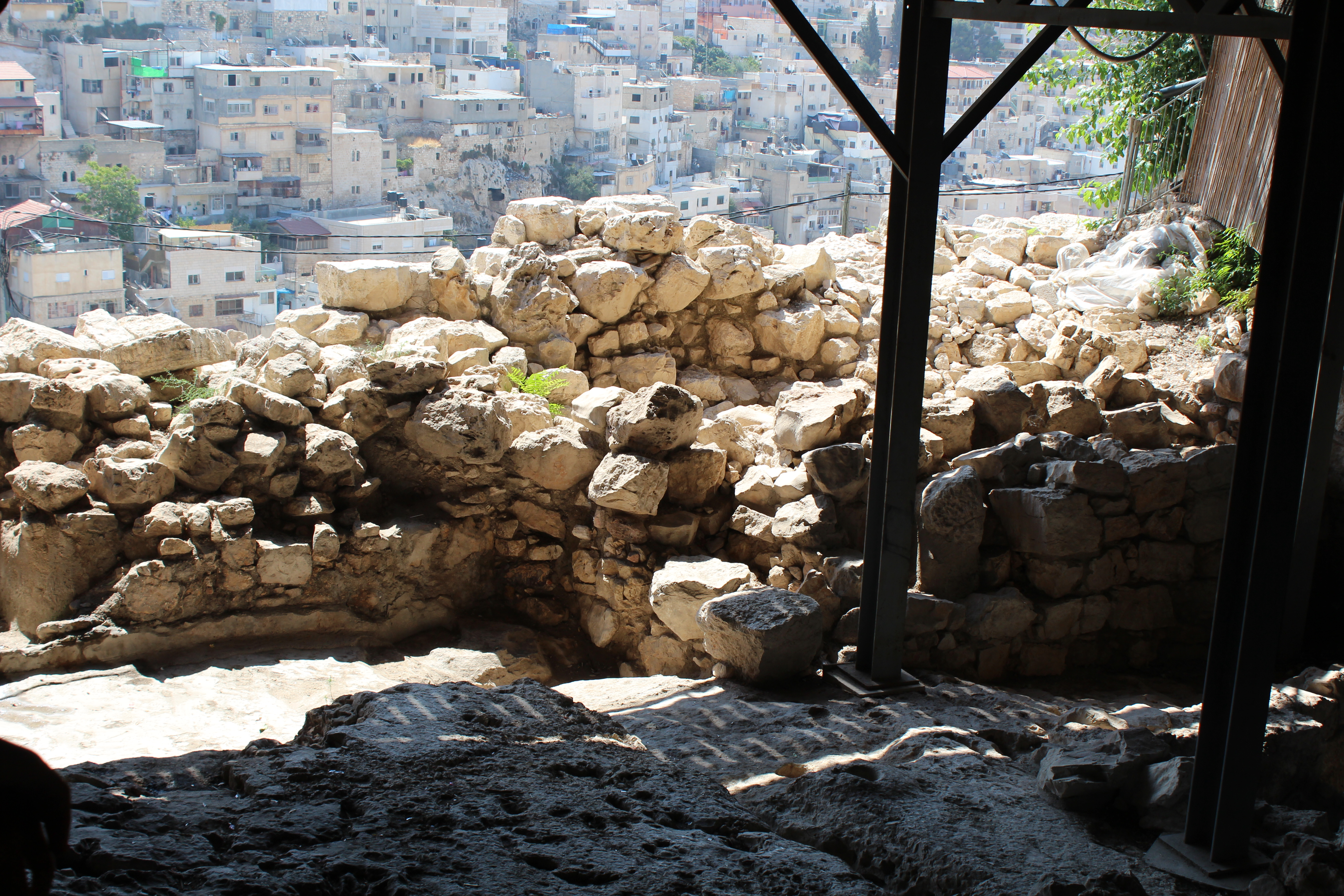
Large Stone Structure

Excavations directed by archaeologist Eilat Mazar between 2005 and 2007, immediately above the stepped stone structure, uncovered a monumental building she termed the "Large Stone Structure," which she has identified as the palace built for David by workmen sent from Tyre according to 2 Samuel 5:11. The identification has received considerable public attention, though some archaeologists have questioned Mazar's dating, and a few have suggested it may have been shaped by her interpretive assumptions. Mazar dated the building's construction to around 1000 BCE based on pottery and other material recovered beneath and within it, but later disturbance of the site left few undisturbed deposits, and other archaeologists, examining the same ceramic evidence, have argued for an earlier date in the 12th century BCE, with the building remaining in use into the early 9th century, which would make it roughly contemporary with the stepped stone structure beneath it.

=== Solomon's Temple and palace ===
No archaeological remains of either Solomon's Temple or the palace have been identified, so reconstructions rely on the biblical descriptions (1 Kings 6–7; 2 Chronicles 2–4), compared with temples discovered elsewhere in the Levant, including those at Tell Tayinat and Ain Dara in the northwestern Levant, as well as two Iron Age temples discovered within Judah, at Tel Arad and Tel Motza. On this basis, Solomon's Temple is generally reconstructed as an elongated structure roughly 10 by 35 meters, divided into three rooms of increasing sanctity, including a porch (ulam), a main hall (heikhal), and an inner sanctuary (debir) that housed the Ark of the Covenant. According to the biblical narrative, Solomon's Temple was furnished with Lebanese cedar and gold paneling, an incense altar, a table for showbread, ten menorah lampstands, and a large bronze basin known as the "sea" (yam) in the inner courtyard.

The palace, described in 1 Kings 7:1–11, is similarly reconstructed from textual and comparative evidence and has been likened to the bit-hilani palace type known from Syria.

=== Ophel ===
South of the Temple Mount, in an area the Hebrew Bible calls the Ophel (עֹפֶל), (Note: A term denoting a city's citadel, also used in the 9th-century BCE Mesha Stele from Moab.) excavations conducted from the late 1960s onward uncovered a fortification complex comprising a gatehouse flanking a large fortified tower, together with an adjoining building termed the "Royal Structure." Not all archaeologists accept this interpretation of the remains as a gate complex, and many date them to the 9th–8th centuries BCE or later rather than to Solomon's time, since later disturbance and the broad dating ranges of the associated pottery make a secure construction date difficult to establish.

=== Siloam Tunnel ===
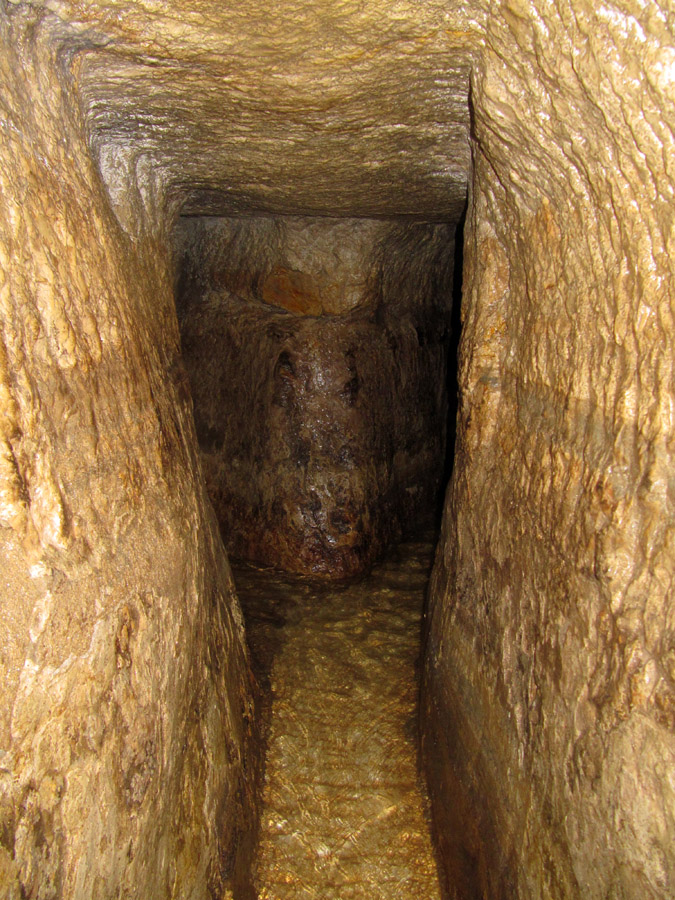
The Siloam tunnel

The Siloam Tunnel, also called Hezekiah's Tunnel, still carries water underground from the Gihon Spring to a pool on the southwest side of the southeastern hill. It winds for more than 500 metres (1,600 ft), about twice the straight-line distance, yet its floor falls only about 30 centimetres (12 in) along its length. Tool marks show that it was cut by two teams working from opposite ends, who met roughly in the middle.

According to 2 Chronicles 32:2–4 and 32:30, Hezekiah blocked the water sources outside the city before the Assyrian siege and diverted the waters of the Gihon to the west side of the City of David. Most scholars identify this work with the tunnel, which replaced the exposed Siloam Channel and delivered water to the Pool of Siloam inside the new wall. Reich and Shukron dispute this view and suggest that the project took years and was begun by one of Hezekiah's predecessors in the early 8th century. Sneh, Weinberger and Shalev estimate at least four years of work, attributing the Siloam Channel to Hezekiah and the tunnel to the 7th century, perhaps under Manasseh. Radiometric dating of the original plaster of the floor supports a date around 700 BCE.

The Siloam inscription, Istanbul Archaeology Museums

The Siloam inscription, found by children in 1880 near the outlet, records in ancient Hebrew how the two teams heard each other through the rock and broke through, and gives the tunnel's length and the height of rock above the workers in cubits. It names no king and bears no date. In 1890 it was cut out of the wall and broken, and the fragments were taken by the Ottoman authorities to Istanbul, where they are still on display today.

== See also ==
- Biblical archaeology
- Timeline of Jerusalem

== Bibliography ==
=== References ===
- Avigad, Nahman (1983). Discovering Jerusalem. Nashville: Thomas Nelson. ISBN 978-0-8407-5299-4.
- Bahat, Dan (2011). The Carta Jerusalem Atlas: Third Updated and Expanded Edition. Jerusalem: Carta. ISBN 978-965-220-807-1.
- Geva, Hillel (2003). "Summary and Discussion of Findings from Areas A, W and X-2". In Geva, Hillel (ed.). Jewish Quarter Excavations in the Old City of Jerusalem Conducted by Nahman Avigad, 1969–1982, Vol. II. Jerusalem: Israel Exploration Society. pp. 501–552. ISBN 978-965-221-051-7.
- Geva, Hillel (2014). "Jerusalem's Population in Antiquity: A Minimalist View". Tel Aviv. 41 (2): 131–160. doi:10.1179/0334435514Z.00000000041. ISSN 0334-4355.
- Magness, Jodi (2024). Jerusalem through the Ages: From Its Beginnings to the Crusades. Oxford University Press. ISBN 978-0190937805.
- Prag, Kay (2018). Re-Excavating Jerusalem: Archival Archaeology. Oxford: Oxford University Press. ISBN 978-0-19-726642-7.
- Reich, Ronny (2011). Excavating the City of David: Where Jerusalem's History Began. Jerusalem: Israel Exploration Society. ISBN 978-965-221-082-1.
