= Kingdom of Judah =

Israelite kingdom in the Southern Levant

Kingdom of Judah 𐤉𐤄𐤃
- c. 930 – c. 587 BCE
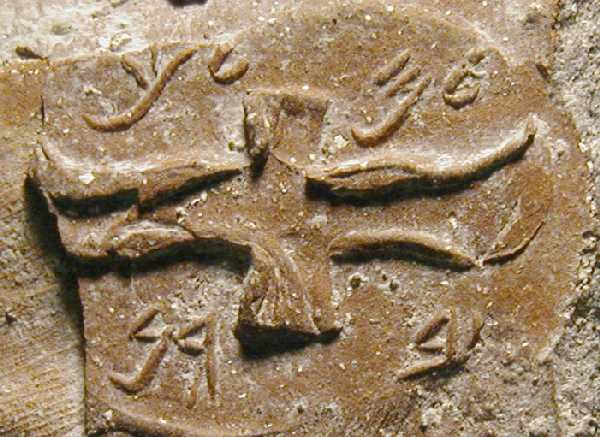
- LMLK seal (around 700 BCE)

- The Kingdoms of Judah and Israel during the 8th century BCE
- Status: Kingdom
- Capital: Jerusalem
- Common languages: Biblical Hebrew
- Religion: Yahwism (Early Judaism); Canaanite religion; Folk religion
- Demonym: Judahite, Judean
- Government: Monarchy
- King
  - c. 931–913 BCE: Rehoboam (first)
  - c. 597–587 BCE: Zedekiah (last)
- Historical era: Iron Age
  - Jeroboam's Revolt: c. 930 BCE
  - Siege of Jerusalem: c. 587 BCE
Preceded by	Succeeded by
Kingdom of Israel - united monarchy (?)	Yehud (Babylonian province)

The Kingdom of Judah (Note: Hebrew: יְהוּדָה Yəhūdā; Akkadian: 𒅀𒌑𒁲 Ya'údi [ia-ú-di]; Imperial Aramaic: 𐤁𐤉𐤕𐤃𐤅𐤃 Bēyt Dāwīḏ 'House of David') was an Israelite kingdom of the Southern Levant during the Iron Age. Centered in the highlands to the west of the Dead Sea, the kingdom's capital was Jerusalem. It was ruled by the House of David for four centuries. Jews are named after Judah, and primarily descend from people who lived in the region.

The Hebrew Bible depicts the Kingdom of Judah as one of the two successor states of the United Kingdom of Israel, a term denoting the united monarchy under biblical kings Saul, David, and Solomon and covering the territory of Judah and Israel. However, during the 1980s, some biblical scholars began to argue that the archaeological evidence for an extensive kingdom before the late 8th century BCE is too weak, and that the methodology used to obtain the evidence is flawed. In the 10th and early 9th centuries BCE, the territory of Judah might have been limitedly populated, comprising some fortified sites and many unfortified rural settlements. The Tel Dan Stele, discovered in 1993, shows that the kingdom existed in some form by the middle of the 9th century BCE, but it does not indicate the extent of its power. Recent excavations at Khirbet Qeiyafa and other sites suggest substantial urbanization and political organization in the southern Levant by the 10th century BCE, though its extent and political affiliation remain debated.

In the 7th century BCE, the kingdom's population increased greatly, prospering under Neo-Assyrian vassalage despite Hezekiah's revolt against the Assyrian king Sennacherib. Josiah took advantage of the political vacuum that resulted from Assyria's decline and the emergence of Saite Egyptian rule over the area to enact his religious reforms. The Deuteronomistic history, which recounts the history of the people of Israel from Joshua to Josiah and expresses a worldview based on the legal principles found in the Book of Deuteronomy, is assumed to have been written during this same time period and emphasizes the significance of upholding them.

With the final fall of the Neo-Assyrian Empire in 605 BCE, competition emerged between Saite Egypt and the Neo-Babylonian Empire over control of the Levant, ultimately resulting in Judah's rapid decline. The early 6th century BCE saw a wave of Egyptian-backed Judahite rebellions against Babylonian rule being crushed. In 587 BCE, Nebuchadnezzar II engaged in a siege of Jerusalem, ultimately destroying the city and ending the kingdom. A large number of Judeans were deported to Babylonia, while others died in the war or fled the country; the fallen kingdom was annexed as a Babylonian province.

After the fall of Babylon to the Achaemenid Empire, the Achaemenid king Cyrus the Great permitted the Jewish exiles to return to their homeland and re-establish their communal and religious institutions under Persian overlordship. Although the restored community enjoyed a degree of autonomy, full Jewish political independence was not achieved again until nearly four centuries later, in the aftermath of the Maccabean Revolt, with the emergence of the Hasmonean kingdom of Judea.

== Geography ==
The Kingdom of Judah was located in the Judean Mountains, stretching from Jerusalem to Hebron and into the Negev Desert. The central ridge, ranging from forested and shrubland-covered mountains gently sloping towards the hills of the Shephelah in the west, to the dry and arid landscapes of the Judaean Desert descending into the Jordan Valley to the east, formed the kingdom's core.

The northern border of Judah extended east–west from the northwestern shore of the Dead Sea, passing near Jericho to the area of Gezer. To the west, the border ran from Gezer across the Shephelah to Beersheba in the northern Negev. In the east, Judah's boundaries followed the Arabah to the western shore of the Dead Sea. In prosperous periods, Judah's influence expanded, stretching southward to Beersheba and beyond, including Kadesh Barnea and likely Kuntillet Ajrud. Its influence possibly extended to the Gulf of Eilat in the south, as well as the Coastal Plain in the west in Mesad Hashavyahu fortress.

== Etymology ==
The name "Judah" (Hebrew: יְהוּדָה, Modern: Yehudah, Tiberian: {{{3}}}) is generally derived from the personal name of Judah, the fourth son of Jacob in the Hebrew Bible, though the toponym's ultimate etymology remains debated among scholars. The biblical narrative in Genesis 29:35 links the name to the Hebrew root y-d-h ("to praise"), but some scholars regard this as a folk etymology, noting that the name does not appear as a personal name until relatively late in the biblical record. An alternative proposal connects Yehudah to the Arabic root whd (wahda), meaning "ravine" or "gorge," suggesting the name may originally have described the rugged terrain of the region before being applied to the tribe and its eponymous ancestor. This topographical reading is considered the more likely explanation by several scholars, who note that "Judah" elsewhere refers to a geographic feature, as in phrases like "the wilderness of Judah" and "the hill country of Judah."

== Archaeological record ==
The formation of the Kingdom of Judah is a subject of heavy debate among scholars, with a dispute emerging between biblical minimalists and biblical maximalists on this particular topic. Due to geopolitical factors like security issues, isolation, and political changes, the core area of the Kingdom of Judah on the south-central highlands has seen limited archaeological exploration compared to regions west of the Jordan River. Few excavations and surveys have been conducted there, creating a notable knowledge gap compared to the extensively-studied Shephelah to the west, which has undergone systematic surveys and numerous scientific excavations.

While it is generally agreed that the narratives of David and Solomon in the 10th century BCE tell little about the origins of Judah, currently, there is no consensus as to whether Judah developed as a split from a unified kingdom Israel (as the Bible claims) or independently. Some scholars suggested that Jerusalem, the kingdom's capital, did not emerge as a significant administrative center until the end of the 8th century BCE. Before then, the archaeological evidence suggests its population was too small to sustain a viable kingdom. Other scholars argue that recent discoveries and radiocarbon tests in Wadi Hilweh also known as the City of David seem to indicate that Jerusalem was already a significant city by the 10th century BCE.

Much of the debate revolves around whether the archaeological discoveries conventionally dated to the 10th century should instead be dated to the 9th century, as proposed by Israel Finkelstein. Recent archaeological discoveries by Eilat Mazar in Jerusalem and Yosef Garfinkel in Khirbet Qeiyafa have been interpreted as supporting the existence of the United Monarchy, but the datings and identifications are not universally accepted.

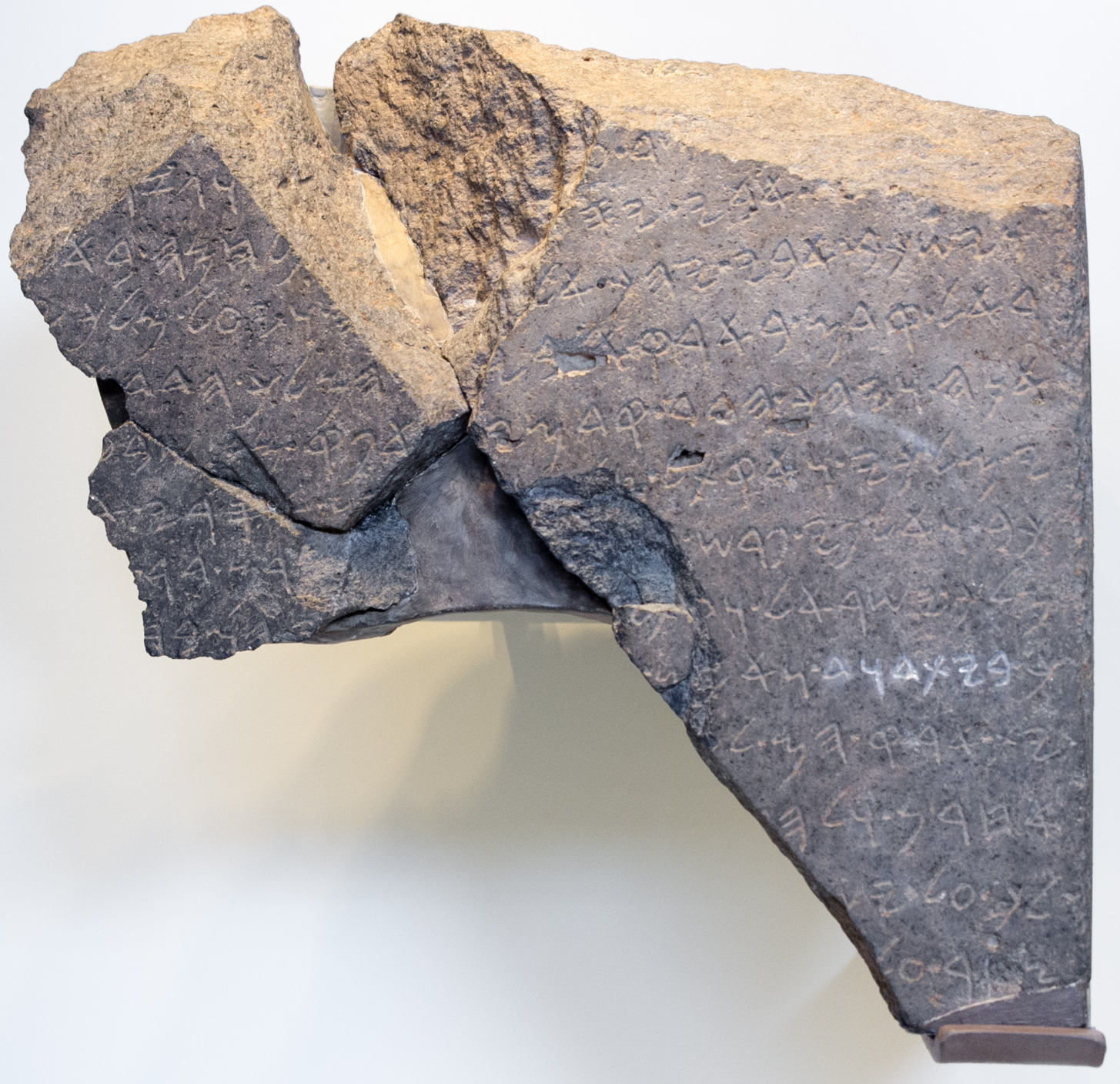
Tel Dan Stele, with the word(s) "House of David" highlighted (9th century BCE)

The Tel Dan stele shows a historical "House of David" ruled a kingdom south of the lands of Samaria in the 9th century BCE, and attestations of several Judean kings from the 8th century BCE have been discovered, but they do little to indicate how developed the state actually was. The Nimrud Tablet K.3751, dated c. 733 BCE, is the earliest known record of the name "Judah" (written in Assyrian cuneiform as Ya'uda or KUR.ia-ú-da-a-a), while an earlier reference to a Judahite envoy seems to appear in a wine list from Nimrud dated to the 780s BCE.

=== Jerusalem ===
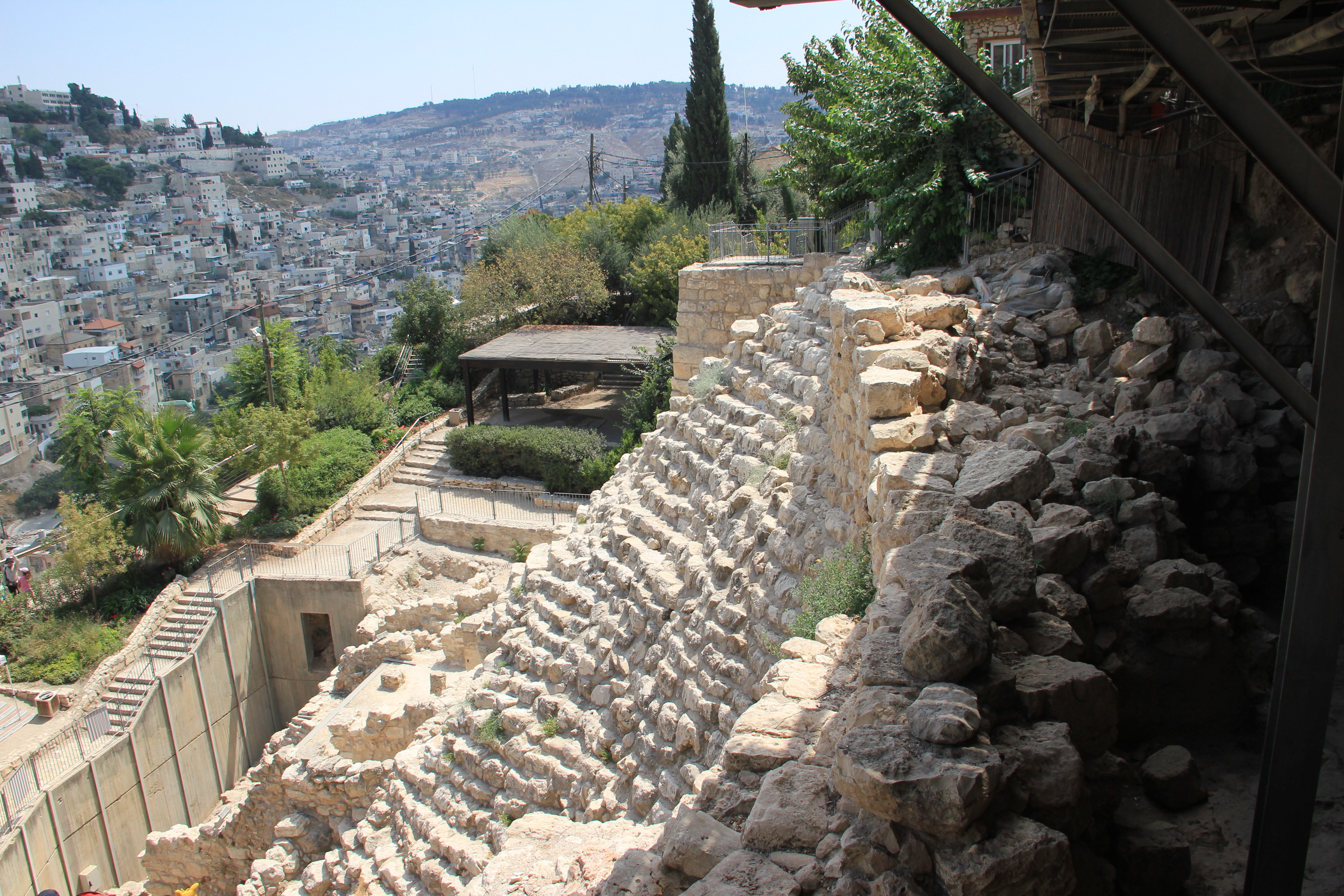
Stepped Stone Structure seen from the Large Stone Structure

The status of Jerusalem in the 10th century BCE is a major subject of debate. The oldest part of Jerusalem and its original urban core are the City of David, which does show evidence of significant Israelite residential activity around the 10th century. Some unique administrative structures such as the Stepped Stone Structure and the Large Stone Structure, which originally formed one structure, contain material culture dated to Iron I. On account of an alleged lack of settlement activity in the 10th century BCE, Israel Finkelstein argues that Jerusalem was then a small country village in the Judean hills, not a national capital, and Ussishkin argues that the city was entirely uninhabited. Amihai Mazar contends that if the Iron I / Iron II A dating of administrative structures in the City of David are correct, which he believes to be the case, "Jerusalem was a rather small town with a mighty citadel, which could have been a center of a substantial regional polity." William G. Dever argues that Jerusalem was a small and fortified city, probably inhabited only by the royal court, priests and clerks. Avraham Faust and Zev Farber argue that Jerusalem was significantly large when compared with most highland sites in ancient Israel, and contained fortifications and public buildings.

=== Literacy ===
A collection of military orders found in the ruins of a military fortress in the Negev dating to the period of the Kingdom of Judah indicates widespread literacy, based on the inscriptions, the ability to read and write extended throughout the chain of command from commanders to petty officers. According to Professor Eliezer Piasetsky, who participated in analyzing the texts, "Literacy existed at all levels of the administrative, military and priestly systems of Judah. Reading and writing were not limited to a tiny elite." That indicates the presence of a substantial educational infrastructure in Judah at the time.

Archaeological research near the Gihon Spring in the City of David has revealed many anepigraphical bullae (that is, bullae bearing only iconography, no inscriptions) dated to the 11th/10th–9th centuries BCE which feature "papyrus lines" on their backs. It has been argued that these seals provide evidence that papyrus texts were written and used in Jerusalem already from the 10th (perhaps 11th) century BCE onwards.

In October 2025, the discovery of a fragment measuring approximately 2.5 cm containing 20 visible characters, dated between the 7th and 8th centuries BC and made of ceramic material from the Tigris basin, was presented to the press. The small fragment bears an expiry date and the words "he who holds the reins", a title known in the Assyrian administration as exclusive to a royal messenger. According to scholars, it is a reminder for the collection of a tribute. This attests to the tense relations between the Kingdom of Judah and the Assyrians described in 2 Kings 18–19, 2 Chronicles 32, Isaiah 36–37, with reference to Hezekiah's rebellion.

=== LMLK seals ===
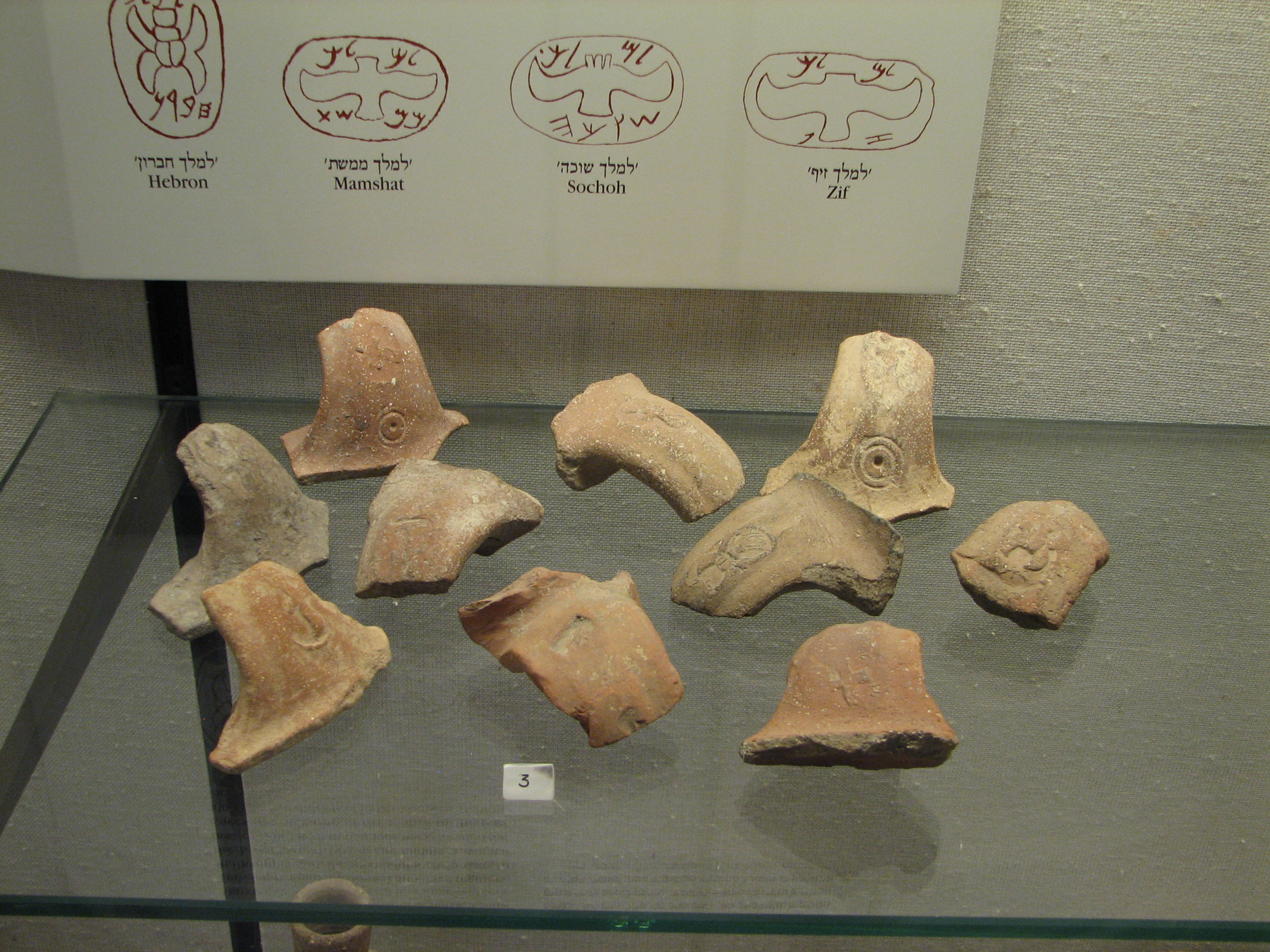
Storage jars handles marked with LMLK seals, Hecht Museum

LMLK seals are archaic Hebrew stamp seals on the handles of large storage jars dating from the reign of King Hezekiah (circa 700 BCE) discovered mostly in and around Jerusalem. Several complete jars were found in situ buried under a destruction layer caused by Sennacherib at Tel Lachish. None of the original seals have been found, but some 2,000 impressions made by at least 21 seal types have been published.

LMLK stands for the Hebrew letters lamedh mem lamedh kaph (Hebrew: לְמֶלֶךְ, romanized: ləmeleḵ), which can be translated as:

- "[belonging] to the king" [of Judah]
- "[belonging] to King" (name of a person or deity)
- "[belonging] to the government" [of Judah]
- "[to be sent] to the King"

=== Everyday life ===
According to a 2022 study, traces of vanilla found in wine jars in Jerusalem might indicate that the local elite enjoyed wine flavored with vanilla during the 7–6th centuries BCE. Until very recently, vanilla was not at all known to be available to the Old World. Archeologists suggested that this discovery might be related to an international trade route that crossed the Negev during that period, probably under Assyrian and later, Third Intermediate Period Egyptian rule.

=== Cities ===
The existence, extent, and political structure of an early Judahite kingdom remain subjects of scholarly debate. Garfinkel's reconstruction identifies a relatively extensive early Judahite territorial system, whereas scholars including Israel Finkelstein and Nadav Na'aman have proposed alternative models in which some of the settlements attributed to Judah were associated with local Canaanite communities or early highland polities other than Judah. According to Yosef Garfinkel, the fortified cities of the Kingdom of Judah during the 10th century BCE were located at Khirbet Qeiyafa, Tell en-Nasbeh, Khirbet el-Dawwara (by Halhul), Tel Beit Shemesh, and Tel Lachish. However, Nadav Na'aman argues against this and says no connection between Khirbet Qeiyafa and the Judean highlands can be established, arguing it likely still was a Canaanite city in the 10th century BCE. Similar discussion exists around Tel Beit Shemesh and Tel Lachish, who according to some scholars belong to the Shephelah and became under influence of Judah later during the 9th or 8th centurty BCE.

Likewise, the site of Tel Rumeida (ancient Hebron) was also a fortified city throughout the 10th-6th centuries BCE, with some differences between scholars like Garfinkel on the one hand and Faust and Finkelstein on the other hand when the settlement became part of the Judahite kingdom.

The sites of Tel Motza and Tel Eton were also urban centers of the Kingdom of Judah in the 10th and 9th centuries BCE. Meanwhile, Tel Burna (identified as biblical Libnah) was a Judahite city that became fortified by a casemate wall around the 9th century BCE.

Tel Be'er Sheva, believed to be the site of the ancient biblical town of Be'er-sheba, was the main Judahite center in the Negev in the 9th and 8th centuries BCE.

=== Forts ===
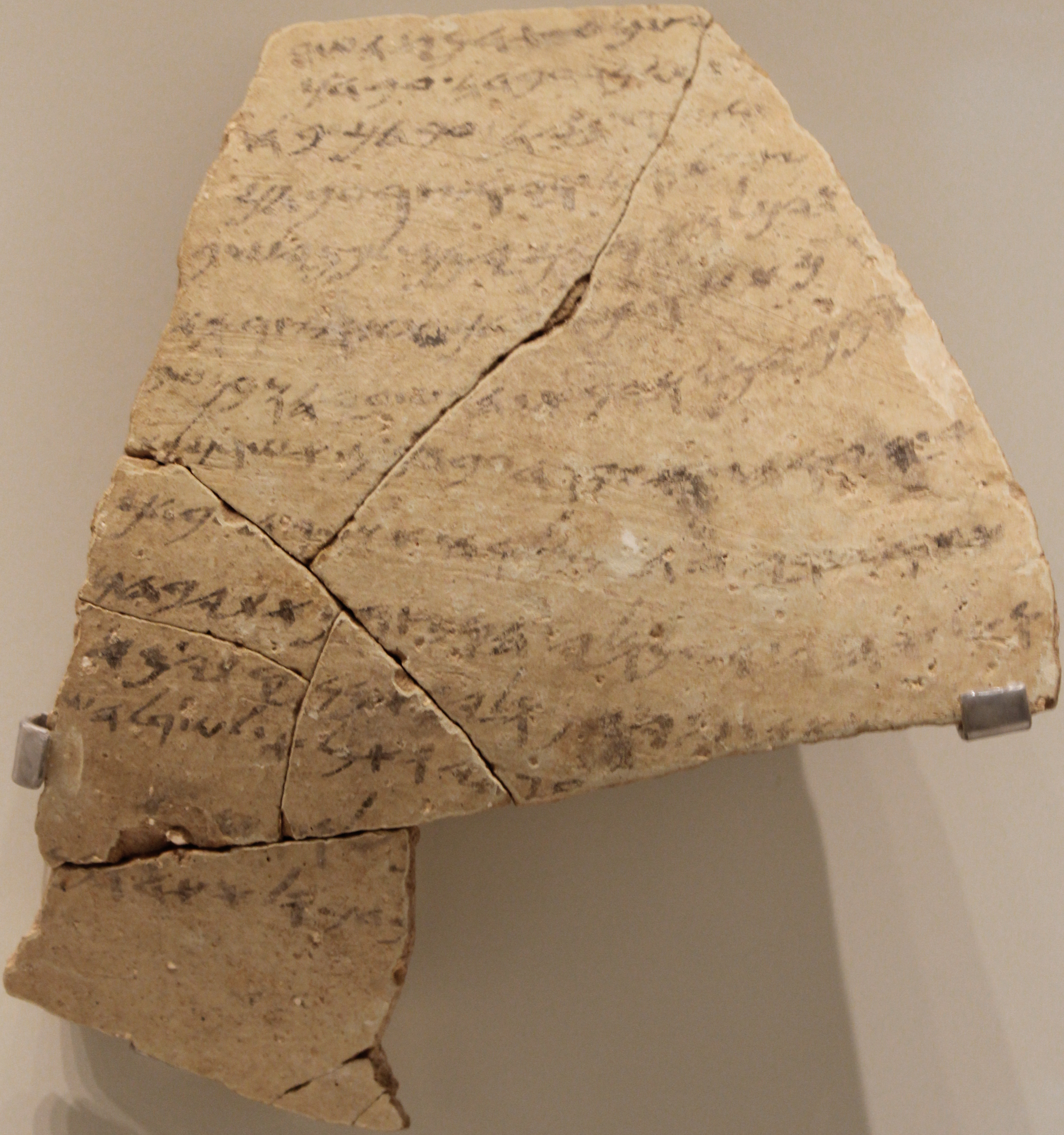
The Yavne-Yam ostracon from the Mesad Hashavyahu fortress, documenting administrative correspondence in Paleo-Hebrew

The Judaean Mountains and Shephelah have seen the discovery of several Judahite fortresses and towers. The fortifications had a large central courtyard surrounded by casemate walls with chambers on the outside wall, and they were square or rectangular in shape. Khirbet Abu et-Twein, which is situated on the Judaean Mountains between modern day Bat Ayin and Jab'a, is one of the most noteworthy fortresses from the period. Great views of the Shepehla, including the Judahite towns of Azekah, Socho, Goded, Lachish, and Maresha, could be seen from this fort.

In the northern Negev, Tel Arad served as a key administrative and military stronghold. It protected the route from the Judaean Mountains to the Arabah and on to Moab and Edom. It underwent numerous renovations and extensions. There are several other Judahite forts in the Negev, including Hurvat Uza, Tel Ira, Aroer, Tel Masos, and Tel Malhata. The main Judahite fortification in the Judaean Desert was found at Vered Yeriho; it protected the road from Jericho to the Dead Sea. A few freestanding, elevated, isolated guard towers of the period were found around Jerusalem; towers of this type were discovered in the French Hill and south to Giloh.

It is clear from the position of Judaean strongholds that one of their primary purposes was to facilitate communications via fire signals across the Kingdom, a method well-documented in the Book of Jeremiah and the Lachish letters.

=== Crisis and Decline ===
There are several archeological findings that highlight elements of crisis and decline in the Kingdom of Judah. The Kingdom of Judah experienced a major political and territorial crisis during the late 8th century BCE following the expansion of the Neo-Assyrian Empire. In 701 BCE, Sennacherib invaded Judah after King Hezekiah rebelled against Assyrian rule. Assyrian records describe the destruction and capture of numerous Judahite fortified settlements and the imposition of tribute on Hezekiah.

Judah subsequently recovered during the 7th century BCE and experienced renewed economic and demographic growth. The kingdom nevertheless became caught between the competing powers of Assyria, Egypt and Babylonia following the collapse of the Assyrian Empire. Babylonian campaigns against Judah culminated in the capture of Jerusalem in 586 BCE, the destruction of the city, and the end of the Judahite monarchy.

The Babylonian conquest left widespread archeological evidence of destruction across Judah. Destruction layers associated with the campaign have been identified at Jerusalem, Lachish, En-Gedi, Khirbet Rabud, Arad, Tel Ira, Ramat Rahel and other sites. Archaeological and archaeomagnetic research has provided particularly strong evidence for the destruction of Lachish in 586 BCE, while recent microarchaeological analysis has documented extensive burning and destruction in an elite building in Jerusalem.

== Biblical narrative ==
=== Jeroboam's revolt and the partition of the United Monarchy ===
According to the biblical account, the United Kingdom of Israel was founded by Saul during the late-11th century BCE, and reached its peak during the rule of David and Solomon. After the death of Solomon circa 930 BCE, the Israelites gathered in Shechem for the coronation of Solomon's son and successor, Rehoboam. Before the coronation took place, the northern tribes, led by Jeroboam, asked the new king to reduce the heavy taxes and labor requirements that his father Solomon had imposed. Rehoboam rejected their petition: "I will add to your yoke: my father hath chastised you with whips, I will chastise you with scorpions" (1 Kings 12:11). As a result, ten of the tribes rebelled against Rehoboam and proclaimed Jeroboam their king, forming the northern Kingdom of Israel. At first, only the tribe of Judah remained loyal to the House of David, but the tribe of Benjamin soon joined Judah. Both kingdoms, Judah in the south and Israel in the north, co-existed uneasily after the split until the destruction of the Kingdom of Israel by Assyria in 722/721.

=== Relations with the Kingdom of Israel ===
For the first 60 years, the kings of Judah tried to re-establish their authority over Israel, and there was perpetual war between them. Israel and Judah warred throughout Rehoboam's 17-year reign. Rehoboam built elaborate defenses and strongholds, along with fortified cities. In the fifth year of Rehoboam's reign, Shishak, who is identified as the pharaoh Shoshenq I of the 22nd Dynasty of Egypt, brought a vast army and took many cities. In the sack of Jerusalem (10th century BCE), Rehoboam gave them all of the treasures out of the temple as a tribute and Judah became a vassal state of Egypt.

Rehoboam's son and successor, Abijah of Judah, continued his father's efforts to bring Israel under his control. He fought the Battle of Mount Zemaraim against Jeroboam of Israel and was victorious with a heavy loss of life on the Israel side. According to the Books of Chronicles, Abijah and his people defeated them with a great slaughter, so that 500,000 chosen men of Israel fell slain, and Jeroboam posed little threat to Judah for the rest of his reign. The border of the tribe of Benjamin was restored to the original tribal border.

Abijah's son and successor, Asa of Judah, maintained peace for the first 35 years of his reign, and he revamped and reinforced the fortresses initially built by his grandfather, Rehoboam. II Chronicles states that at the Battle of Zephath, the Egyptian-backed chieftain Zerah the Kushite and his million men and 300 chariots were defeated by Asa's 580,000 men in the Valley of Zephath near Maresha. The Bible does not state whether Zerah was a pharaoh or a general of the army. The Kushites were pursued to Gerar, in the coastal plain, where they stopped out of sheer exhaustion. The resulting peace kept Judah free from Egyptian incursions until the time of Josiah, some centuries later.

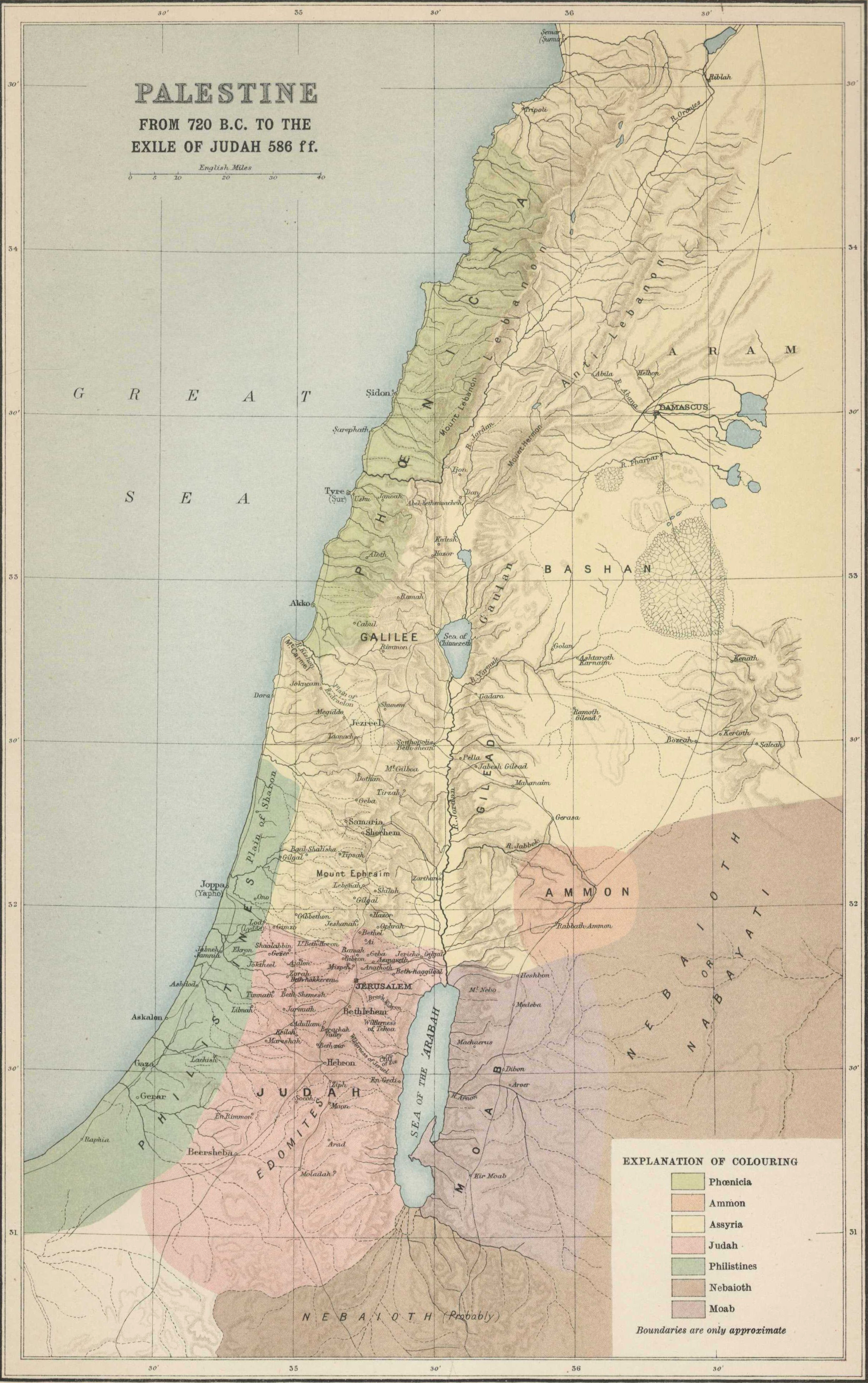
Palestine from 720 BC to the exile of Judah.

In his 36th year, Asa was confronted by Baasha of Israel, who built a fortress at Ramah on the border, less than ten miles from Jerusalem. The capital came under pressure, and the military situation was precarious. Asa took gold and silver from the Temple and sent them to Ben-Hadad I, the king of Aram-Damascus, in exchange for the Damascene king cancelling his peace treaty with Baasha. Ben-Hadad attacked Ijon, Dan and many important cities of the tribe of Naphtali, and Baasha was forced to withdraw from Ramah. Asa tore down the unfinished fortress and used its raw materials to fortify Geba and Mizpah in Benjamin on his side of the border.

Asa's successor, Jehoshaphat, changed the policy towards Israel and instead pursued alliances and cooperation with it. The alliance with Ahab was based on marriage. The alliance led to disaster for the kingdom with the Battle of Ramoth-Gilead according to 1 Kings 22. He then allied with Ahaziah of Israel to carry on maritime commerce with Ophir. However, the fleet equipped at Ezion-Geber was immediately wrecked. A new fleet was fitted out without the cooperation of the king of Israel. Although it was successful, the trade was not prosecuted. He joined Jehoram of Israel in a war against the Moabites, who were under tribute to Israel. This war was successful, and the Moabites were subdued. However, on seeing Mesha's act of offering his son in a human sacrifice on the walls of Kir of Moab (now al-Karak) filled Jehoshaphat with horror, he withdrew and returned to his land.

Jehoshaphat's successor, Jehoram of Judah, formed an alliance with Israel by marrying Athaliah, the daughter of Ahab. Despite the alliance with the stronger northern kingdom, Jehoram's rule of Judah was shaky. Edom revolted, and he was forced to acknowledge its independence. A raid by Philistines and Arabs or perhaps South Arabians looted the king's house and carried off all of his family except for his youngest son, Ahaziah of Judah.

=== Clash of empires ===
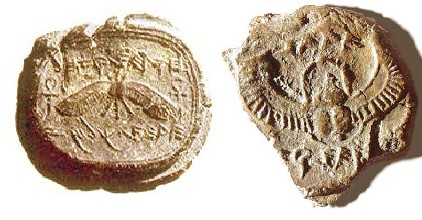
"To Hezekiah, son of Ahaz, king of Judah" – royal seal found at the Ophel excavations in Jerusalem

After Hezekiah became the sole ruler in c. 715 BCE, he formed alliances with Ashkelon and Egypt and made a stand against Assyria by refusing to pay tribute. In response, Sennacherib of Assyria attacked the fortified cities of Judah. Hezekiah paid three hundred talents of silver and thirty talents of gold to Assyria, which required him to empty the temple and royal treasury of silver and strip the gold from the doorposts of Solomon's Temple. However, Sennacherib besieged Jerusalem in 701 BCE though the city was never taken.

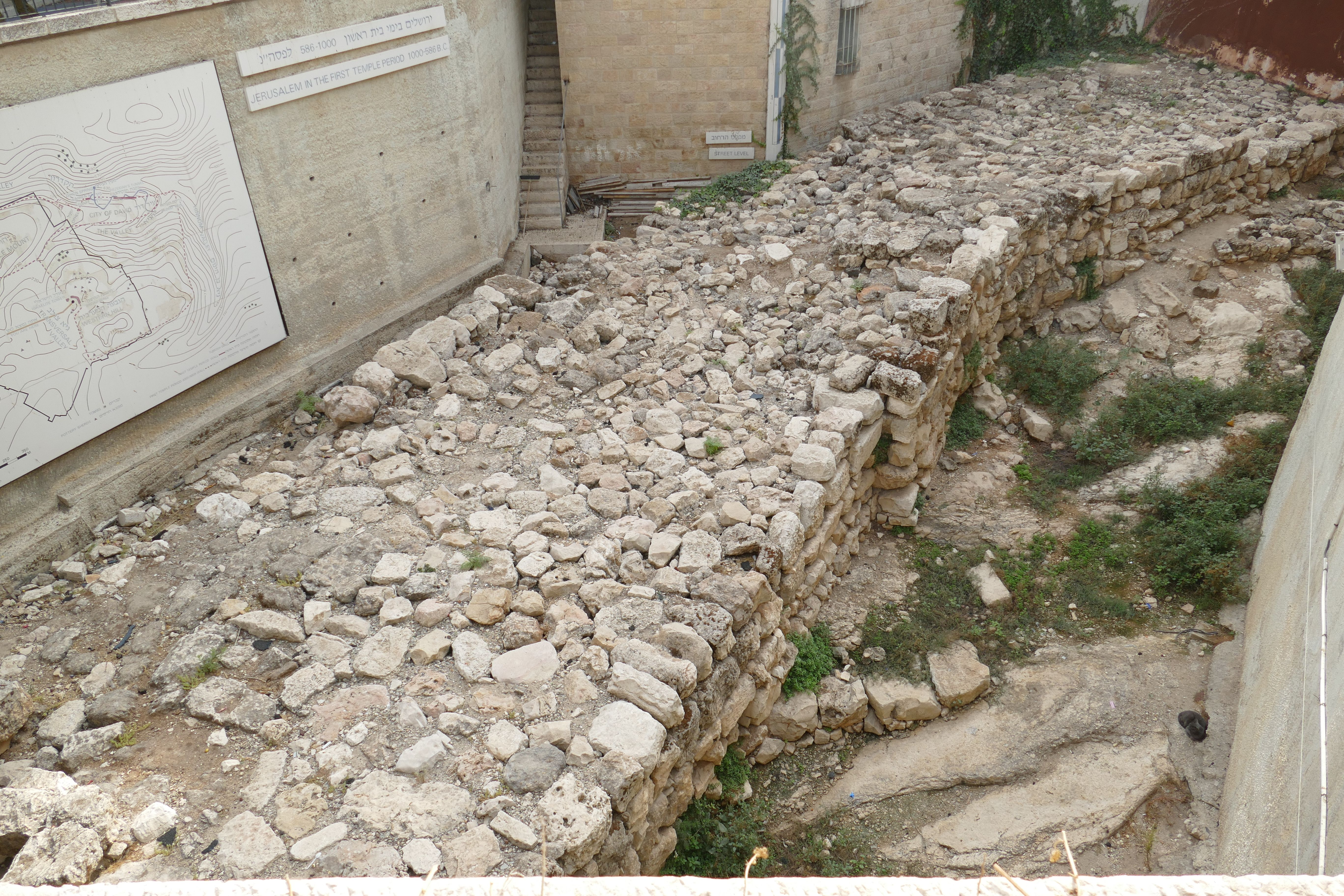
Broad Wall, built during the reign of king Hezekiah (late-8th century BCE)

During the long reign of Manasseh (c. 687/686 – 643/642 BCE), Judah was a vassal of Assyrian rulers: Sennacherib and his successors, Esarhaddon and Ashurbanipal after 669 BCE. Manasseh is listed as being required to provide materials for Esarhaddon's building projects and as one of a number of vassals who assisted Ashurbanipal's campaign against Egypt.

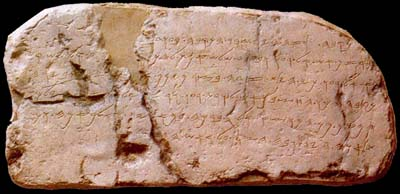
Siloam inscription found in the Siloam tunnel, Jerusalem

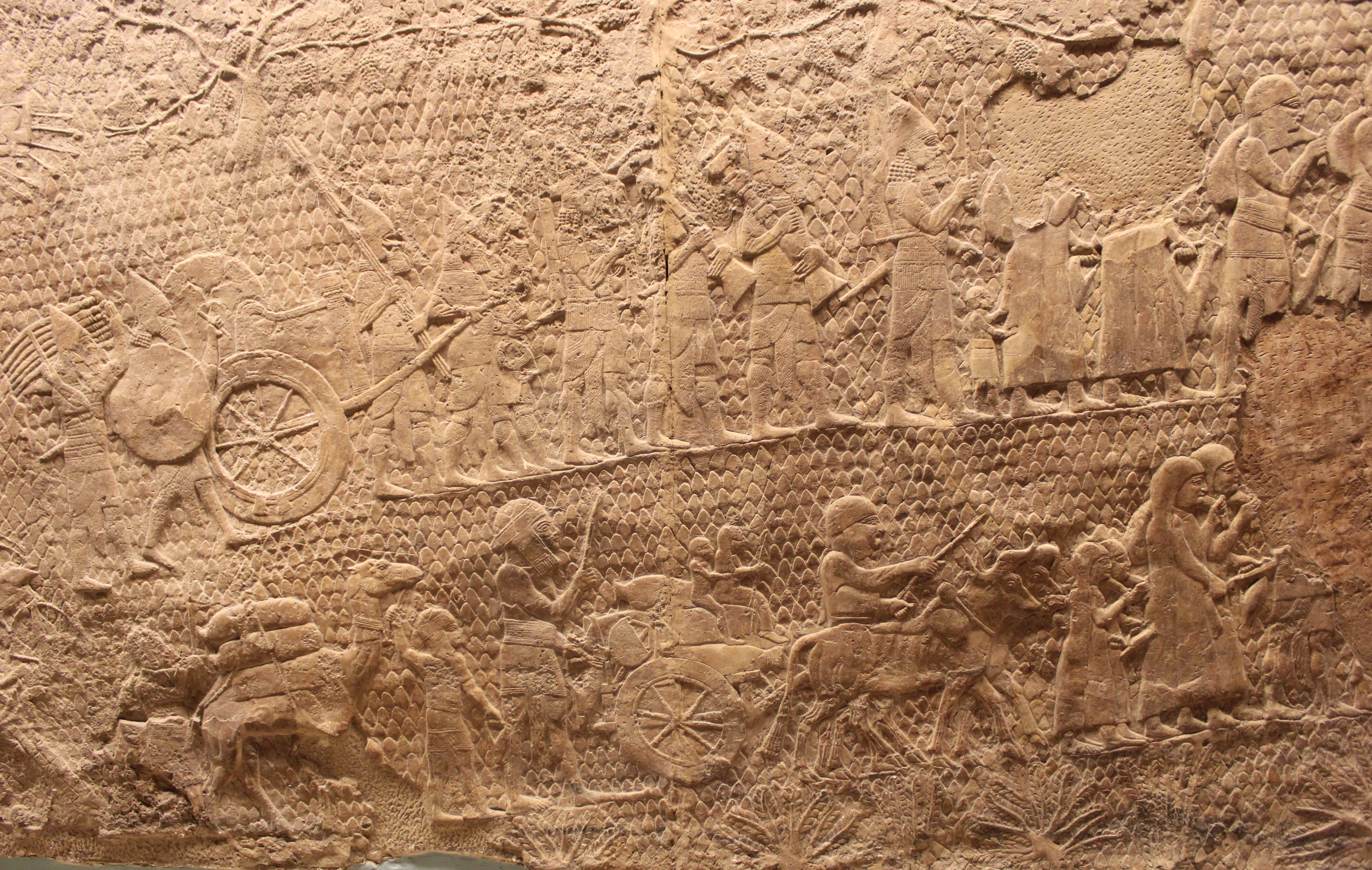
The Assyrian Lachish reliefs, depicting the capture of Lachish (c. 701 BCE). Assyrian soldiers carry off booty from the city, and Judean prisoners are taken into exile with their goods and animals.

When Josiah became king of Judah in c. 641/640 BCE, the international situation was in flux. To the east, the Neo-Assyrian Empire was beginning to disintegrate, the Neo-Babylonian Empire had not yet risen to replace it and Egypt to the west was still recovering from Assyrian rule. In the power vacuum, Judah could govern itself for the time being without foreign intervention. However, in the spring of 609 BCE, Pharaoh Necho II personally led a sizable army up to the Euphrates to aid the Assyrians. Taking the coastal route into Syria at the head of a large army, Necho passed the low tracts of Philistia and Sharon. However, the passage over the ridge of hills, which shuts in on the south the great Jezreel Valley, was blocked by the Judean army, led by Josiah, who may have considered that the Assyrians and the Egyptians were weakened by the death of Pharaoh Psamtik I only a year earlier (610 BCE). Presumably in an attempt to help the Babylonians, Josiah attempted to block the advance at Megiddo, where a fierce battle was fought and Josiah was killed. Necho then joined forces with the Assyrian Ashur-uballit II, and they crossed the Euphrates and lay siege to Harran. The combined forces failed to hold the city after capturing it temporarily, and Necho retreated back to northern Syria. The event also marked the disintegration of the Assyrian Empire.

On his return march to Egypt in 608 BCE, Necho found that Jehoahaz had been selected to succeed his father, Josiah. Necho deposed Jehoahaz, who had been king for only three months, and replaced him with his older brother, Jehoiakim. Necho imposed on Judah a levy of a hundred talents of silver (about 3 3/4 tons or about 3.4 metric tons) and a talent of gold (about 34 kilograms (75 lb)). Necho then took Jehoahaz back to Egypt as his prisoner, never to return.

Jehoiakim ruled originally as a vassal of the Egyptians by paying a heavy tribute. However, when the Egyptians were defeated by the Babylonians at Carchemish in 605 BCE, Jehoiakim changed allegiances to pay tribute to Nebuchadnezzar II of Babylon. In 601 BCE, in the fourth year of his reign, Nebuchadnezzar attempted to invade Egypt but was repulsed with heavy losses. The failure led to numerous rebellions among the states of the Levant that owed allegiance to Babylon. Jehoiakim also stopped paying tribute to Nebuchadnezzar and took a pro-Egyptian position. Nebuchadnezzar soon dealt with the rebellions. According to the Babylonian Chronicles, after invading "the land of Hatti (Syria/Palestine)" in 599 BCE, he laid siege to Jerusalem. Jehoiakim died in 598 BCE during the siege and was succeeded by his son Jeconiah at an age of either eight or eighteen. The city fell about three months later, on 2 Adar (March 16) 597 BCE. Nebuchadnezzar pillaged both Jerusalem and the Temple and carted all of his spoils to Babylon. Jeconiah and his court and other prominent citizens and craftsmen, along with a sizable portion of the Jewish population of Judah, numbering about 10,000 were deported from the land and dispersed throughout the Babylonian Empire. Among them was Ezekiel. Nebuchadnezzar appointed Zedekiah, Jehoiakim's brother, the king of the reduced kingdom, who was made a tributary of Babylon.

=== Destruction and dispersion ===
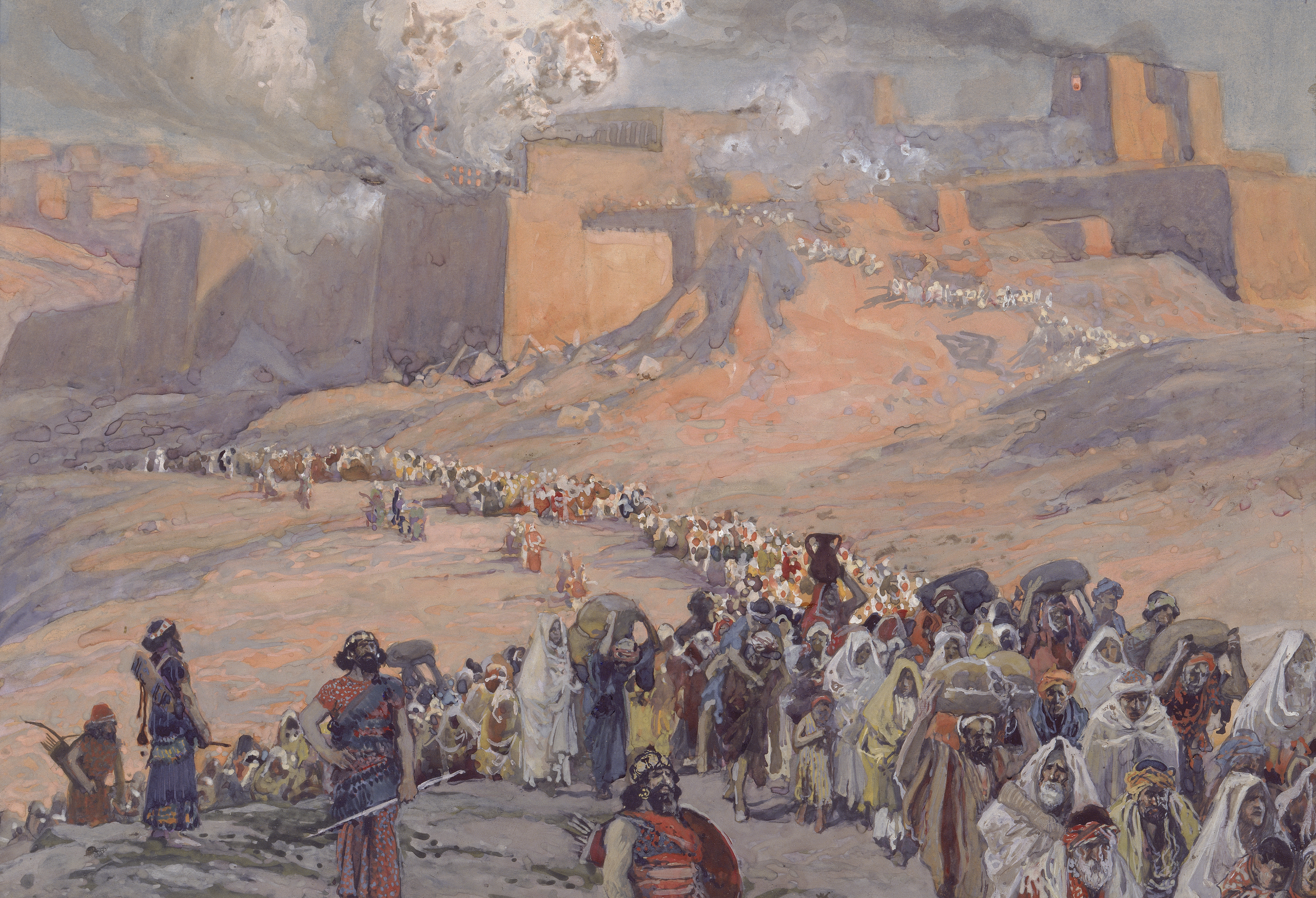
The Flight of the Prisoners (1896) by James Tissot; the exile of the Jews from Jerusalem to Babylon

Despite the strong remonstrances of Jeremiah and others, Zedekiah revolted against Nebuchadnezzar by ceasing to pay tribute to him and entered an alliance with Pharaoh Hophra. In 589 BCE, Nebuchadnezzar II returned to Judah and again besieged Jerusalem. Many Jews fled to surrounding Moab, Ammon, Edom and other countries to seek refuge. The city fell after a siege, which lasted either eighteen or thirty months, and Nebuchadnezzar again pillaged both Jerusalem and the Temple and then destroyed both. After killing all of Zedekiah's sons, Nebuchadnezzar took Zedekiah to Babylon and so put an end to the independent Kingdom of Judah. According to the Book of Jeremiah, in addition to those killed during the siege, some 4,600 people were deported after the fall of Judah. By 586 BCE, much of Judah had been devastated, and the former kingdom had suffered a steep decline of both its economy and its population.

Modern archaeological research on sixth-century Judah indicates a sharp decline in the region's population. Estimates vary among scholars, but generally point to a drop from roughly 110,000 people before the Babylonian conquest to somewhere between 15,000 and 40,000 afterwards. This collapse was not caused by deportations alone. Wartime deaths from battle, execution, and famine caused by disrupted agriculture, as well as voluntary flight abroad, also contributed.

== Aftermath ==
=== Babylonian Yehud ===
Jerusalem apparently remained uninhabited for much of the 6th century BCE, and the centre of gravity shifted to Benjamin, the relatively unscathed northern section of the kingdom, where the town of Mizpah became the capital of the new Babylonian province of Yehud for the remnant of the Jewish population in a part of the former kingdom. That was standard Babylonian practice. When the Philistine city of Ashkelon was conquered in 604 BCE, the political, religious and economic elite (but not the bulk of the population) was banished and the administrative centre shifted to a new location.

Gedaliah was appointed governor of the Yehud province, supported by a Babylonian guard. The administrative centre of the province was Mizpah in Benjamin, not Jerusalem. On hearing of the appointment, many of the Judeans who had taken refuge in surrounding countries were persuaded to return to Judah. However, Gedaliah was soon assassinated by a member of the royal house, and the Chaldean soldiers killed. The population that was left in the land and those who had returned fled to Egypt for fear a Babylonian reprisal, under the leadership of Yohanan ben Kareah. They ignored the urging of the prophet Jeremiah against the move. In Egypt, the refugees settled in Migdol, Tahpanhes, Noph and Pathros, and possibly Elephantine, and Jeremiah went with them as a moral guardian.

=== Exile to Babylon ===
The numbers that were deported to Babylon and that made their way to Egypt and the remnant that remained in the land and in surrounding countries are subject to academic debate. The Book of Jeremiah reports that 4,600 were exiled to Babylonia. The two Books of Kings suggest that it was 10,000 and later 8,000.

=== Persian Yehud and Hellenistic period ===
In 539 BCE, the Achaemenid Empire conquered Babylonia and allowed the exiles to return to Yehud Medinata and to rebuild the Temple, which was completed in the sixth year of Darius (515 BCE) under Zerubbabel, the grandson of the second to last king of Judah, Jeconiah. Yehud Medinata was a peaceful part of the Achaemenid Empire until its fall in c. 333 BCE to Alexander the Great. Judean independence was reestablished after the Maccabean revolt, and the establishment of the Hasmonean Kingdom in the 2nd century BCE.

Jews are named after Judah, and primarily descend from people who lived in the former Kingdom.

== Religion ==
The major theme of the Hebrew Bible's narrative is the loyalty of Judah, especially its kings, to Yahweh, which it states is the God of Israel. Accordingly, all of the kings of Israel (except to some extent Jehu) and many of the kings of Judah were "bad" in terms of the biblical narrative by failing to enforce monotheism. Of the "good" kings, Hezekiah (727–698 BCE) is noted for his efforts at stamping out idolatry (in his case, the worship of Baal and Asherah, among other traditional Near Eastern divinities), but his successors, Manasseh of Judah (698–642 BCE) and Amon (642–640 BCE), revived idolatry, which drew down on the kingdom the anger of Yahweh. King Josiah (640–609 BCE) returned to the worship of Yahweh alone, but his efforts were too late, and Israel's unfaithfulness caused God to permit the kingdom's destruction by the Neo-Babylonian Empire in the Siege of Jerusalem (587/586 BCE).

It is now widely agreed among academic scholars that the Books of Kings are not an accurate portrayal of religious attitudes in Judah or Israel of the time. Nevertheless, epigraphic evidence attests to Yahweh's prominence within Judahite religion.

Evidence of cannabis residues has been found on two altars in Tel Arad dating to the 8th century BC. Researchers believe that cannabis may have been used for ritualistic psychoactive purposes in Judah.

== Economy ==
Judah's traditional economy was a traditional mediterranean subsistence. The kingdom's economy transformed under Assyrian influence, shifting from subsistence farming to a system where each region focused on specific agricultural products.

The highlands west and north of Jerusalem, and likely to the south as well, were known for viticulture. The Late Iron Age saw a surge in rural activity across the Soreq and Rephaim Valleys, with 65 sites identified and excavated. These sites formed a four-tiered hierarchy, including large administrative centers like Tel Moza, smaller villages, isolated buildings and farms, and agro-production spots like wine presses. The Nahal Shmuel area, in particular, became a key center for wine production, with 57 documented wine presses, while further north in Gibeon, the largest concentration of wine storage cellars, 63 in total, was found, used for aging wine.

== See also ==
- Ancient Israel and Judah
- Kings of Judah
- List of artifacts in biblical archaeology
- List of Jewish states and dynasties
- United Kingdom of Israel, the kingdom before the split
- Kingdom of Israel, the Northern Kingdom
- Hasmonean Judea, the Second Temple-era kingdom
- Israel, the modern country
