= Millo =

Ancient structure in Jerusalem

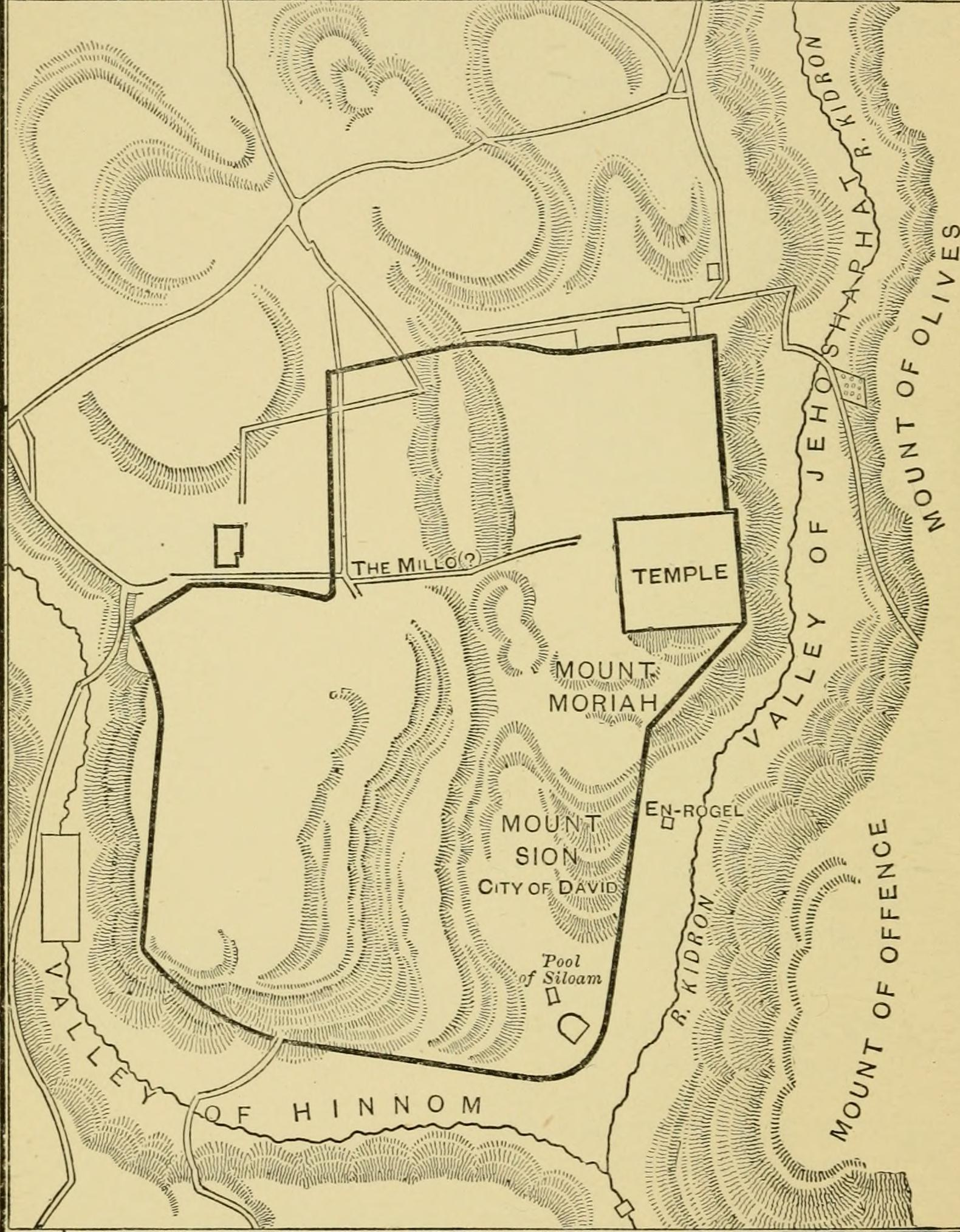
Map of Davidic Jerusalem, with the location of the Millo indicated.

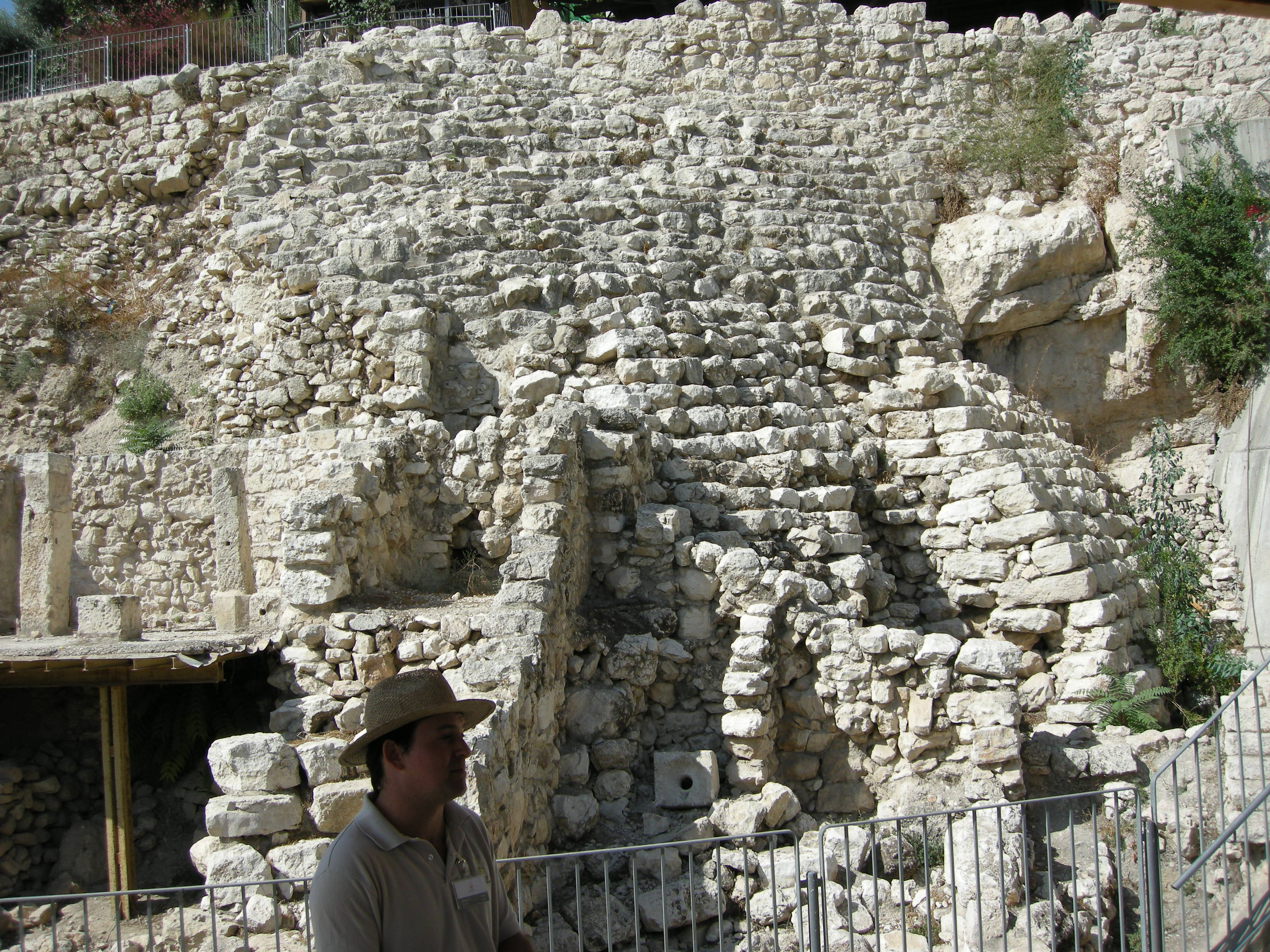
Stepped stone structure/millo with the House of Ahiel to the left

The Millo (Hebrew: המלוא, romanized: ha-millō) was a structure in Jerusalem referred to in the Hebrew Bible, first mentioned as being part of the city of David in 2 Samuel 5:9 and the corresponding passage in the Books of Kings (1 Kings 9:15) and later in the Books of Chronicles (1 Chronicles 11:8). However it previously seems to have been a rampart built by the Jebusites prior to Jerusalem's being conquered by the Israelites. The texts also describe the Millo built by Solomon and repaired by Hezekiah, without giving an explanation of what exactly the Millo was: there is therefore some debate among scholars as to the Millo's specific nature. The most common assumption among archaeologists and historians of ancient Israel is that the Millo is the Stepped Stone Structure uncovered by Kathleen Kenyon and demonstrated by Eilat Mazar to be connected to a Large Stone Structure which she discovered in 2005.

== Hebrew Bible ==
In the Books of Samuel, Millo is mentioned as the boundary of David's construction while building up the City of David after the capture of Jerusalem from the Jebusites. The New King James Version identifies Millo as literally "The Landfill", while the New International Version translates it to "supporting terraces".

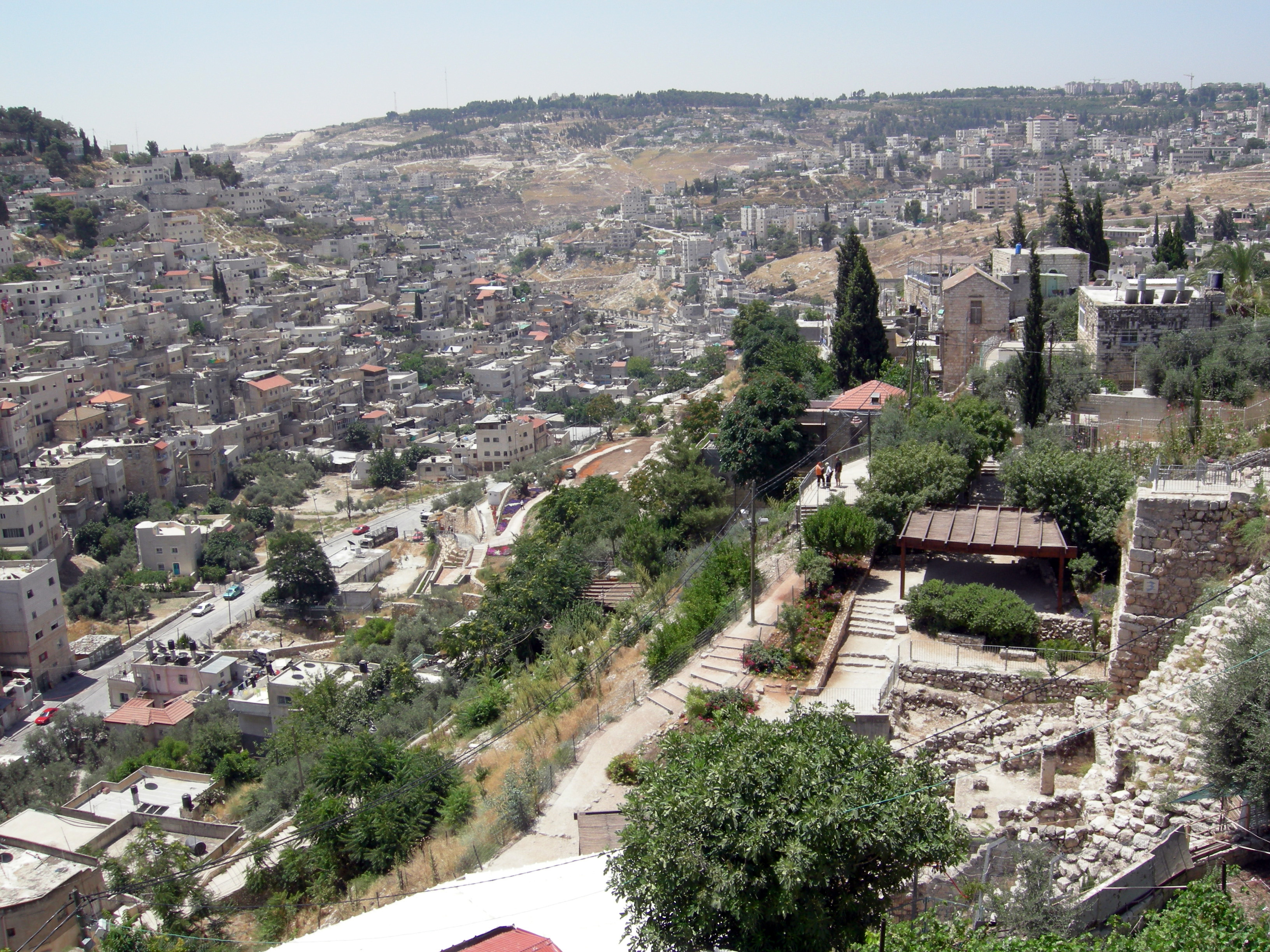
Kidron Valley viewed from the Old City of Jerusalem, with Millo (Area G) to the lower right.

Hezekiah's repair of the Millo is mentioned within a list of repairs to military fortifications, and several scholars generally believe that it was something connected to military activity, such as a tower, citadel, or simply a significant part of a wall. However, taking into account that the potentially cognate term mulu, from Assyrian, refers to earthworks, it is considered more likely that it was an embankment which flattened the slope between Ophel and the Temple Mount.

== Archaeology ==
A recent excavation by Eilat Mazar directly above the Stepped Stone Structure shows that the structure connects with and supports the Large Stone Structure. Mazar presents evidence that the Large Stone Structure was an Israelite royal palace in continuous use from the tenth century until 586 BC. Her conclusion that the stepped stone structure and the large stone structure are parts of a single, massive royal palace makes sense of the biblical reference to the millo as the House of Millo in 2 Kings 12:20 and in 2 Chronicles 24:25 as the place where King Joash was assassinated in 799 BC while he slept in his bed. Millo is derived from "fill", (Hebrew milui). The stepped stone support structure is built of fills. This identification has also been supported by Nadav Na'aman.

More recently, some scholars have proposed a location of the biblical millo in the fortified area surrounding the Gihon Spring.
