= Stepped Stone Structure =

Iron Age structure in Jerusalem

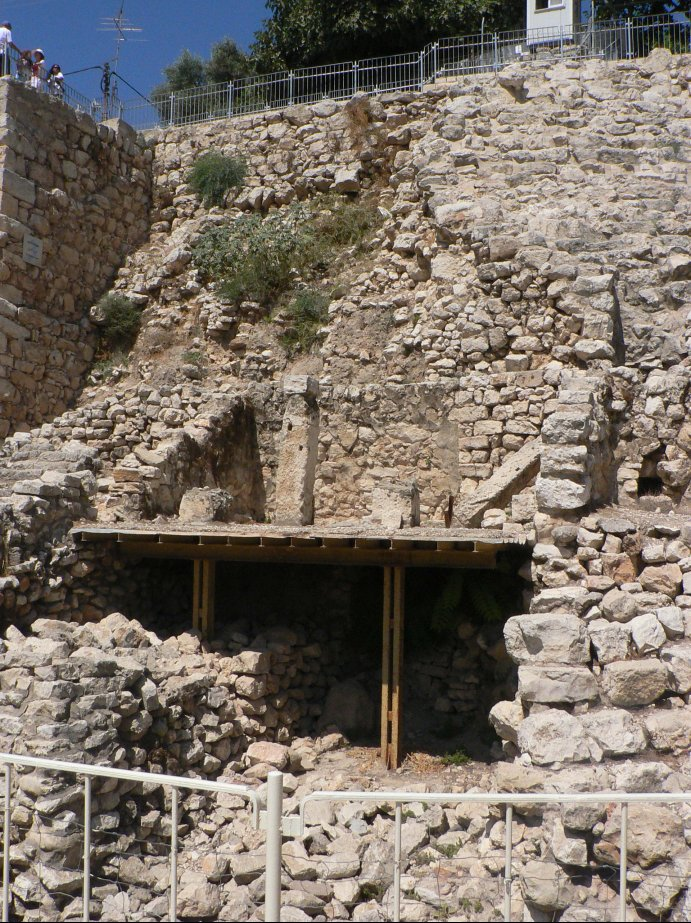
The structure with the "House of Ahiel" built on top of it

The Stepped Stone Structure is the name given to the remains at a particular archaeological site (sometimes termed Area G) on the eastern side of the City of David, the oldest part of Jerusalem. The curved, 60-foot-high (18 m), narrow stone structure is built over a series of terraces (hence the name). A casemate wall adjoins the structure from a northerly direction at the upper levels, and may have been the original city wall.

== Excavation and interpretation ==
R. A. Stewart Macalister, the first to excavate the structure in the 1920s, called the remains he had found a "ramp" and believed it to be Jebusite. Work continued in the 1960s with Kathleen Kenyon, who dated the structure to the start of Iron Age II (1000–900 BCE). Yigal Shiloh excavated in the 1970s–80s. After the discoveries by Kenyon and Shiloh, some scholars have suggested that the structure might be a retaining wall of a large administrative building or fortress. Israel Finkelstein et al. propose and argue that the upper part of the structure was either built, or substantially rebuilt in the Hasmonean period. However, Jodi Magness argues that the archaeological evidence suggests that the structure was initially built in the 12th century BCE (Iron Age I).

=== Millo theory ===
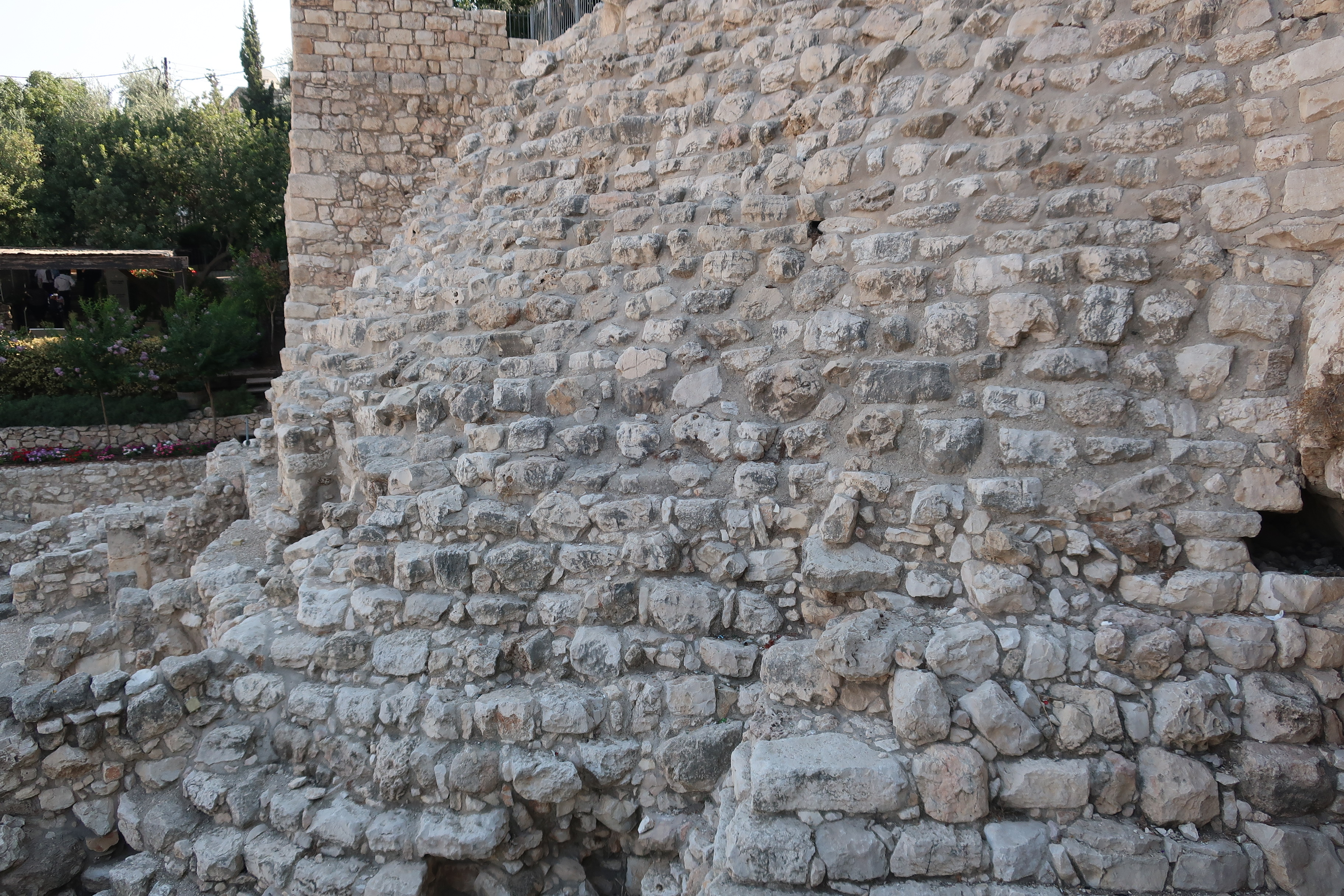
Stepped structure unearthed at the ancient City of David (Jerusalem)

It is hypothesized that the structure may be the Biblical Millo. A recent excavation by Eilat Mazar directly above the Stepped Stone Structure shows that the structure connects with and supports the Large Stone Structure. Mazar's interpretation of the evidence yields her hypothesis that the Large Stone Structure was an Israelite royal palace in continuous use from the tenth century until 586 BCE. She motivates her conclusion that the stepped stone structure and the large stone structure are parts of a single, massive royal palace by citing the biblical reference to the House of Millo in 2 Kings 12:21 as the place where King Joash was assassinated in 799 BCE while he slept in his bed. Millo is derived from "fill", (Hebrew milui). The stepped stone support structure is built of fills.

== See also ==
- Large Stone Structure
- Millo
