= Large Stone Structure =

Ancient structure in Jerusalem, attributed to King David

Coordinates: 31.774246°N 35.235777°E

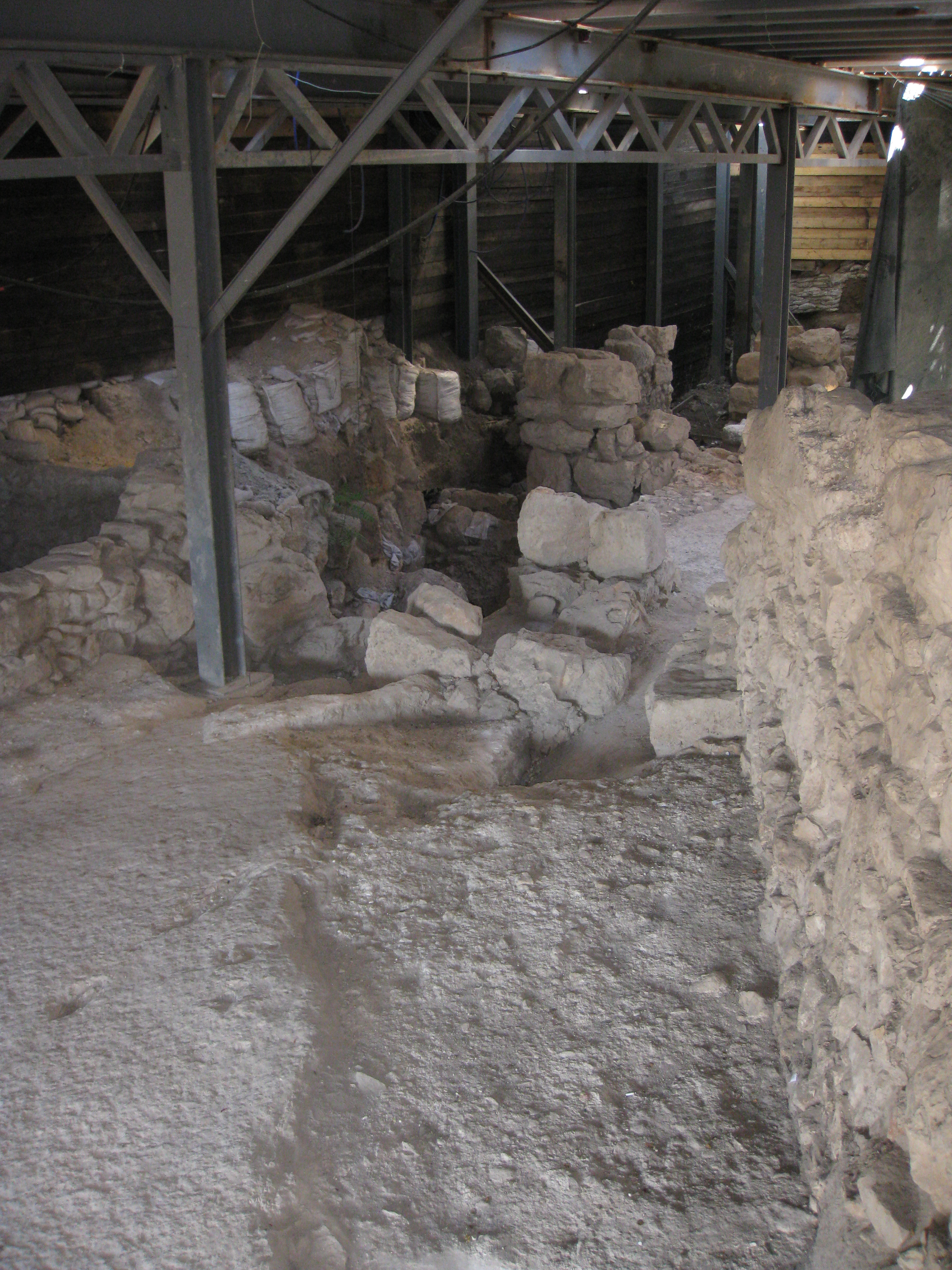
Part of the large stone structure.

The Large Stone Structure (Hebrew: מבנה האבן הגדול Mivne haEven haGadol) is the name given to a set of archaeological remains interpreted by the excavator, Israeli archaeologist Eilat Mazar, as being part of a single large public building in the City of David, presumably the oldest settlement core of Jerusalem. Mazar tentatively dated the findings to the tenth to ninth century BCE. Mazar chose this particular name for the structure because of its proximity to another site known as the Stepped Stone Structure. Mazar announced the discovery on 4 August 2005, and stated that she believed it may be the remains of King David's palace as recorded in the Hebrew Bible (Tanakh)’s Book of Samuel II (“Shmuel Bet”). The interpretation of the remains as those of a single building, the suggested date, and the association with King David, have been challenged by other archaeologists. The excavation was sponsored by the Shalem Center, a Jerusalem-based research institute founded in 1994.

== Discovery ==
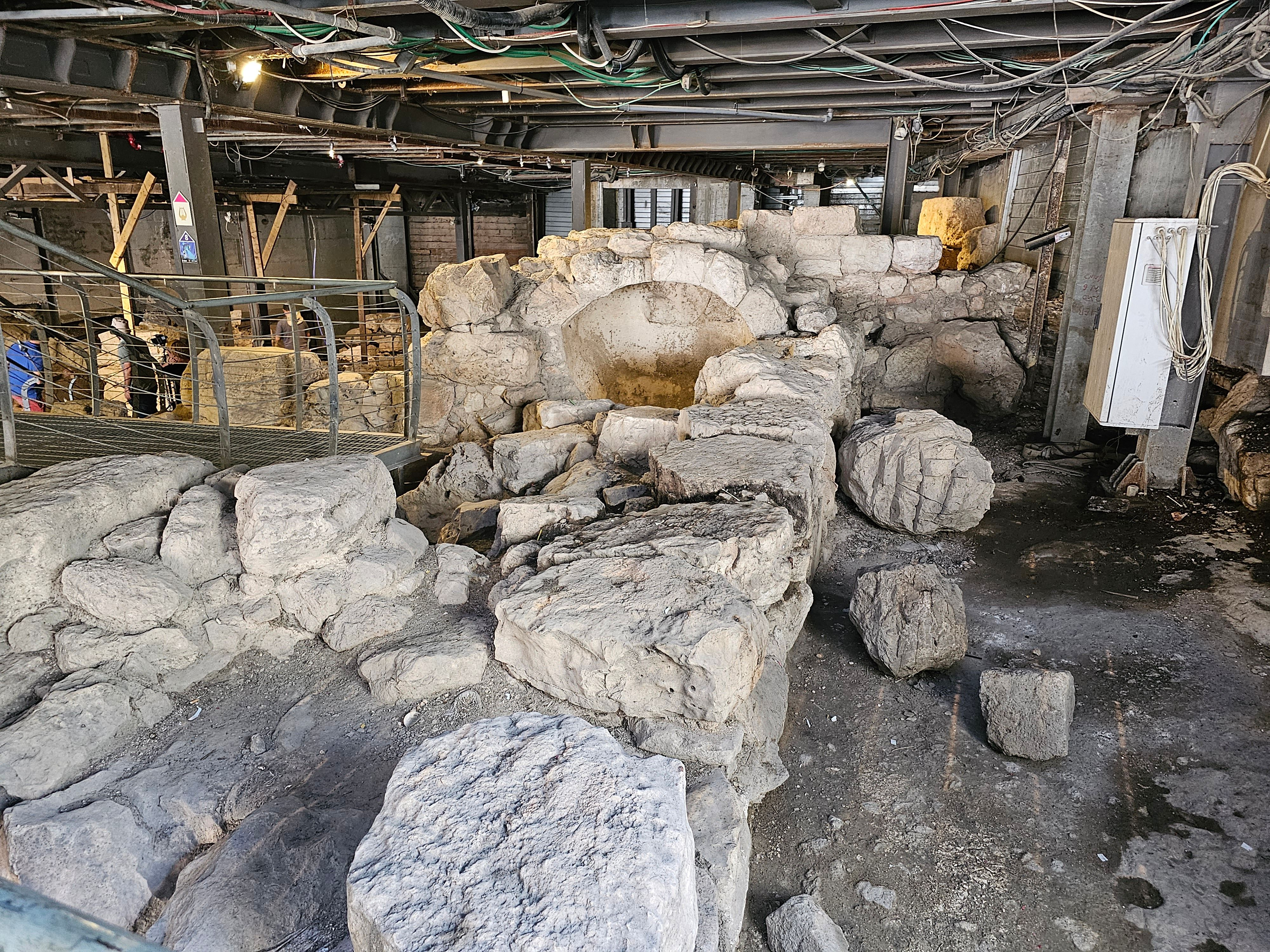
Ruins of the Large Stone Structure

In 1997, Eilat Mazar, seeking to find the Palace of David, used a reference in the Second Book of Samuel to David going down to the stronghold after having been anointed (2 Samuel 5:17), to estimate where the site might be located. Since the only area of higher elevation than the Ophel, the oldest part of Jerusalem, is just to its north, Mazar started digging there in February 2005. About 2 m (6 ft 7 in) underneath the surface, she discovered fourth to sixth century Byzantine Era artifacts, including a well preserved mosaic floor. Beneath these she found artifacts from the Second Temple Period (516 BCE – 70 CE), and finally underneath these she found large foundations of a substantial structure, which she claimed to have been the Palace of David.

=== Bullae from the 7th–6th century BCE ===
The first of two notable written finds at the site is a bulla (seal) of a government official named Jehucal, son of Shelemiah, son of Shevi. This person seems to be mentioned (twice) in the Book of Jeremiah, and thus presumably lived in the late seventh or early sixth century BCE (i.e., at about the same time as Jeremiah). The second bulla discovered at this site is that of another government official, Gedaliah, son of Pashhur, of that same time period, who also seems to be named in the Book of Jeremiah.

=== Architectural remains ===
As of 2005 the dig was ongoing, with progress limited by the current occupants of the land atop the ruins. According to The New York Times,

Mazar continues to dig, but right now, three families are living in houses where she would most like to explore. One family is Muslim, one Christian, and one Jewish.

By February 2007, the second phase of the dig, which took place on a plot adjacent to the first phase, had revealed that the building was larger than Dr. Mazar had previously thought, included walls that are up to 7 m (23 ft) thick, and showed that parts of the building relate to the famous "stepped stone structure" which was discovered and excavated in the 1920s–1980s.

=== Artifacts ===
Artifacts found within the Large Stone Structure that support a possible tenth century BCE date include imported luxury goods, including two Phoenician-style ivory inlays, which were once attached to iron objects. Comparable objects found in a Phoenician tomb at Achziv suggest that they may have decorated a sword handle. A quantity of luxury round, carinated bowls with red slip and hand burnishing support both the tenth century BCE date and a sophisticated and urban life-style. A bone has been radiocarbon dated by Elisabetta Boaretto at the Weizmann Institute of Science, showing a probable date between 1050 and 780 BCE. A large section of a "delicate and elegant" Black-on-Red jug, also found in the structure, is of a kind dated to the second half of the tenth century BCE.

== Stepped Stone Structure ==
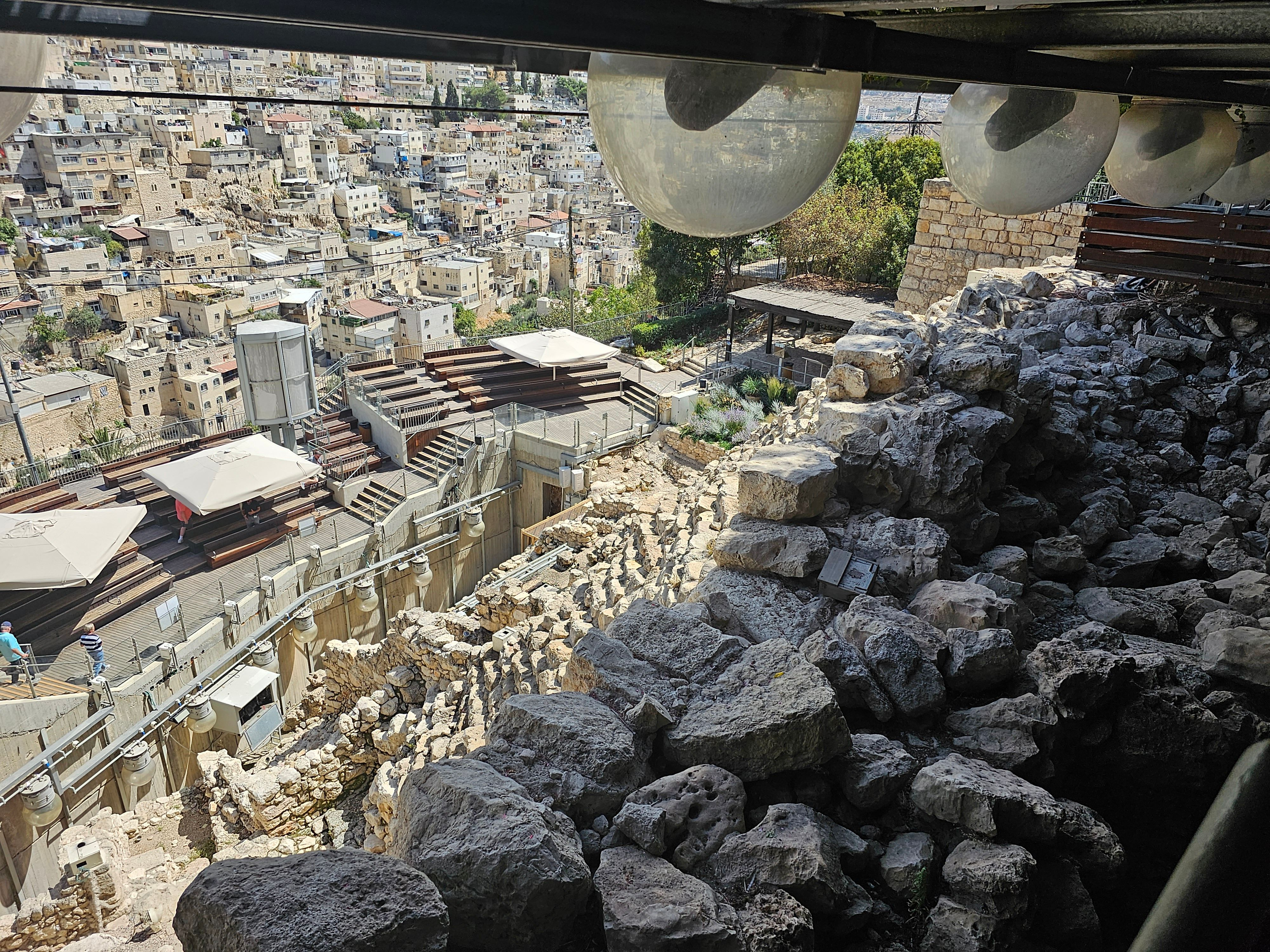
The wall of the Large Stone Structure (foreground) overlooking the Stepped Stone Structure

The Stepped Stone Structure is the name given to the remains at an archaeological site (sometimes termed Area G) on the eastern side of the City of David. It is a curved, 60 ft (18 m) high, narrow stone structure which is built as a series of terraces (hence the name). It was uncovered during a series of excavations by R. A. S. Macalister in the 1920s, Kathleen Kenyon in the 1960s, and Yigal Shiloh in the 1970s–1980s. Kathleen Kenyon dated the structure to the start of Iron Age II (1000–900 BC); Macalister believed it to be Jebusite in origin, therefore from the Bronze Age. Macalister, the first to excavate the structure, called the remains he had found a ramp; other scholars, after the more recent discoveries by Kenyon and Shiloh, have suggested that it might be a retaining wall, or a fortress.

Holding an opposing view, Israel Finkelstein et al. suggest that the upper part of the structure is, unlike the lower part, not from the Iron Age, but Hellenistic (Hasmonean) in date or later.

Mazar believed, as of 2007, that the Stepped Stone Structure connects with and supports the Large Stone Structure. Mazar presents evidence that the Large Stone Structure was an Israelite royal palace in continuous use from the 10th century until 586 BC. Her conclusion that the stepped stone structure and the large stone structure are parts of a single, massive royal palace makes sense of the biblical reference to the Millo as the House of Millo in 2 Kings 12:21 and 2 Chronicles 24:25, describing it as the place where King Joash was assassinated in 799 BC while he slept in his bed. Millo is derived from "fill" (Hebrew milui). The stepped stone support structure is built of fills.

The Millo is described in the Bible as having been built by Solomon (1 Kings 9:24 and repaired by Hezekiah (2 Chronicles 32:4–5), without giving an explanation of what exactly the Millo was. However it is mentioned as being part of the City of David (2 Samuel 5:9). In the Books of Samuel, Millo is mentioned as boundary of King David's construction while building up the City of David after the capture of Jerusalem from the Jebusites. The King James Version identifies Millo as literally "The Landfill", while the New International Version translates it to "supporting terraces".

Hezekiah's repair of the Millo is mentioned within a list of repairs to military fortifications, and several scholars generally believe that it was something connected to military activity, such as a tower, citadel, or simply a significant part of a wall. However, taking into account that the potentially cognate term mulu, from Assyrian, refers to earthworks, it is considered more likely that it was an embankment which flattened the slope between Ophel and the Temple Mount.

== Interpretation ==
The dig was sponsored by the Shalem Center, a foundation that was established in 1994 to promote Zionism in Israel. Eilat Mazar was a senior fellow at the foundation.

=== Not one building, different periods ===
In 2007, Israel Finkelstein, Ze'ev Herzog, David Ussishkin and Lily Singer-Avitz coauthored a paper to lower the dating assigned to the structure given by Eilat Mazar. The coauthors also suggested that the walls unearthed by Mazar do not belong to a single building, arguing that the more substantial, more regular walls to the west of the site align with a larger rectangular structure, including upper parts of the Stepped Stone Structure, and a mikveh ritual bath believed to have been used in the Hasmonean dynasty period; while what they consider the flimsier irregular remains on the eastern side of the site should be treated as a separate entity. The coauthors additionally argued that Mazar's approach was biased. However, the attempt to re-date the site and claim that the two structures were not part of the same structure received a detailed response by Amihai Mazar. Agreeing with Mazar, Avraham Faust noted that Herzog's paper was written prior to the publication of all the excavation material and that its full publication was sufficient to settle the debate in favour of Eilat Mazar's interpretation of the dating of the site. In 2005 Amihai Mazar suggested that the site may be a Jebusite fortress—the fortress of Zion that the Books of Samuel claim was conquered by David. William G. Dever agrees with Mazar's (both Amihai and Eilat) interpretation and dates the structure to the 10th century BCE.

=== Stratigraphy and age ===
Eilat Mazar dated the site by the different types of pottery found above and below the building's remains. The pottery below the foundation is dated by Eilat Mazar to the Iron Age I, and the pottery above is dated to the Iron Age II. Due to the law of superposition (the empirical rule stating that, in general, the older things are lower down), this implies, according to Eilat Mazar, that the foundation—and hence the building—was constructed somewhere between Iron Age I and Iron Age II (roughly between the eleventh and tenth centuries BC). Israel Finkelstein argued that (Eilat) Mazar's pottery dating is flawed, concluding that "all one can safely say is that its various elements post-date the late Iron I/early Iron IIA and predate the Roman period. Circumstantial evidence seems to suggest the dating of most elements to the late Hellenistic period". However, Jodi Magness has recently concluded that the archaeological evidence does indicate that the Large Stone Structure was initially built in the 12th century BCE (Iron Age I) and that it remained in use until at least the early 9th century BCE.

=== Eilat Mazar's arguments ===
Mazar made the following arguments for an Israelite royal palace from the early tenth century:

1. The enormous scale of the structure and physical distinctions between it and other contemporary structures.
2. That it was erected outside the walls of the Jebusite city.
3. Pottery and pavements found in the structure and dated to the tenth century.
4. That the latest pottery found beneath the structure is a "sizable and richly varied" assemblage dated to the twelfth to eleventh centuries BCE.
5. Both pottery types and radiocarbon dating point to a date around 1000 BCE.
6. Pottery found in the attached Stepped Stone Structure also dates its construction to the tenth century.
7. Two Phoenician-styled ivory inlays and a black-and-red jug imported from Cyprus attest to a Phoenician connection, a tenth-century date, and a luxurious life-style.
8. Bullae with names of royal officials mentioned in the Bible attest to royal use continuing until 586 BCE and "illustrate" the reliability of Biblical sources.

== See also ==
- Biblical archaeology
- 2005 in archaeology
