= IPray TV =

iPray TV is a Christian church ministry and video streaming service founded by Michael Peros which streams live video from the holy sites in Jerusalem. It is the first live video streaming service to accomplish this. They first became notable by doing the first live streaming of the Christmas celebration at the Church of the Nativity in Bethlehem in 2008, as well as the Easter and Pentecost celebrations of 2009. They also streamed the first broadcast live from inside the Church of the Holy Sepulchre in Jerusalem. Because of their use of Unicast technology, millions of people were able to view the broadcast at once, which had not been done before.

The service was launched in 2008, and has since provided 24/7 video streaming to key Christian holy sites in Jerusalem, including: Calvary, Mount of Olives, Mount of Ascension, the Eastern Gate, the City of David, the Garden of Gethsemane, and the city of Jerusalem. This streaming allows for pastors and everyday people to view the holy sites at any given time from their computer, and the service is free. The site provides both live streaming and archives of past videos and old footage of various events.

Additionally, iPray TV allows users to specifically request prayers from other users. Users can also upload their own videos, leave comments, read the iPray blog, and partake in other activities.
