= Ophel pithos =

Archaeological artifact

The Ophel pithos is an 11th- or 10th-century-BCE inscription on a fragment of a ceramic jar found near Jerusalem's Temple Mount by Israeli archeologist Eilat Mazar.

== Discovery ==
The Ophel pithos was found in 2012 during excavations and the find was announced in summer 2013. It is the earliest alphabetical inscription found in Jerusalem. Eilat Mazar has dated the potsherds on which the inscription was written to the 10th century BCE. The interpretation of the fragment is controversial, with readings varying from sensationalist claims to minimalist scepticism.

The fragment comes from a pithos, a large neckless ceramic jar, discovered in a ceramic assemblage together with 6 other large storage jars that together comprised a fill that was employed to reinforce the earth under the second floor of a building. The archaeologists excavating the site identified it as contemporary with the biblical period of David and Solomon, and dated to the 10th century BCE. According to Shmuel Ahituv of Ben-Gurion University, the inscription wound about the jar's shoulder, yielding the end of the inscription and one letter of its beginning.

Experts identified the writing as an example of linear alphabetic Northwest Semitic letters. Ahituv identified it specifically as a variety of Proto-Canaanite or early Canaanite script predating the period of Israelite rule, and the earliest indisputably Hebrew inscription found in Jerusalem by some 250 years. Ahituv transliterated the text to read, from left to right:

𐤍𐤋𐤍𐤄𐤐𐤒𐤌 (green indicates a doubtful letter)
M, Q, P, H, N, L?, N.

Thus transliterated, this combination yields no comprehensible meaning within any known West Semitic language. The archaeologists surmised that, since it was not written in Hebrew, the text might refer to the name of one of the Jebusites, who were the population inhabiting Jerusalem before the kingdom of David was established.

Christopher Rollston agreed with Ahituv's reading, in the face of some scholars who argue that the script was Phoenician. Rollston notes that in this period, the direction of writing in Northwest Semitic and Phoenician was standardized as sinistrograde (right to left), whereas the incised text is typical of Early Alphabetic, i.e., dextrograde (left to right) script. Rollston would date the text to the 11th century, which is on the early end of Ahituv's 11th–10th-century dating.

Rollston's transcription,

𐤍𐤓𐤍𐤄𐤋𐤒𐤌 (green indicates a doubtful letter)
M, Q, L, H, N, R?, N.

yields a significant lexeme, or Semitic root, namely QLH, meaning 'pot, cauldron' (as in modern Hebrew קלה kala, 'to toast'). He also conjectures that the succeeding nun might be followed not by L, lamd, but R, rosh, suggesting a name attested in the Tanakh, namely Ner (נר), as evidence for biblical Abner ben Ner, the commander of Saul's army.

Gershon Galil, to the contrary, takes the view that the text is Hebrew and should be dated to the second half of the 10th century BCE, considering that it reads sinistrograde, from right to left, and reportedly provides two alternative readings:

𐤍𐤕𐤍𐤕𐤕𐤍𐤇𐤋𐤒𐤌 (red indicates missing letters)
[nt]n [tt]n ḥlqm

which would yield the meaning, [Your poor brothers – You sh]all [gi]ve them their share.

Or

𐤌𐤉𐤉𐤍𐤄𐤋𐤒𐤌 (red indicates missing letters)
[…]m [yy]n hlq m[…],

yielding the meaning 'spoiled wine from…'. Galil's preferred reading (b) takes the initial m as the final letter in a regnal year formula, esrim (twenty) or shloshim (thirty); the double yod in yayin 'wine' as a clue to its southern Hebrew character, while halaq would be a definition, typical of Ugarit's oenological classification, referring to the lowest quality wine. The implication would be that the jar contained poor wine used for the king's corvee labourers.

Douglas Petrovich agrees with Galil that the inscription is Hebrew, should be read sinistrograde, and that the remnant strokes only can be restored to yod-yod, as no other restoration is plausible. The main difference in his view is that he reads the initial visible letter (from the right) as a nun, rather than a mem. He also agrees that the inscription was written as a year-date/labeling formula for a commercial product (wine, in this case), as exemplified by the jar-handle inscriptions from Gibeon of the 7th century BCE, though he considers that the inscription likely reads, '[In the firs]t (regnal) year: pseudo-[win]e from [the garden of ??]'. He suggests that the pithos was created during Solomon's Year 1 since David did not control Jerusalem in his Year 1, and the reign of Rehoboam is probably too late for the archaeological context of the pottery assemblage.

A methodologically different approach was chosen by Lehmann & Zernecke from the Research Unit on ancient Hebrew & Epigraphy of Johannes Gutenberg University of Mainz, Germany. To avoid any presupposition and because the sherd has no decisive diagnostic lexeme that could give a hint about the language it is written in, Lehmann & Zernecke decided to analyse the script only with regard to the writing process itself and to reconstruct the broken letters on a strictly comparative palaeographic base alone. They suggest a reading either M-Q-P-Ḥ-N-M-Ṣ-N or N-Ṣ-M-N-Ḥ-P-Q-M, depending on the writing direction. This can not be set without a decisive clue about the language, which in Jerusalem at that time would not be restricted to only Hebrew. This would appear as:

𐤍𐤑𐤌𐤍𐤇𐤐𐤒𐤌
MQPḤNMṢN

Daniel Vainstub proposed that the script might not be Canaanite, but instead ancient South Arabian script. He proposes a left-to right reading of šy lḏn ḫ̇; n:

𐩬 𐩭𐩬𐩹𐩡 𐩺𐩪 (green indicates a doubtful letter)
ŠY LḎN Ḫ N

suggesting that the single complete word lḏn refers to ladan, a kind of resin. According to this proposal, the inscription is evidence that the southwest Arabian incense trade extended as far north as Jerusalem at this time, and the inscription may even refer to the incense offering in the Jerusalem temple.

== See also ==
- Ophel ostracon
- List of inscriptions in biblical archaeology
- Chronology of the Bible
- List of cities of the ancient Near East
