= Ophel ostracon =

Ancient pottery piece

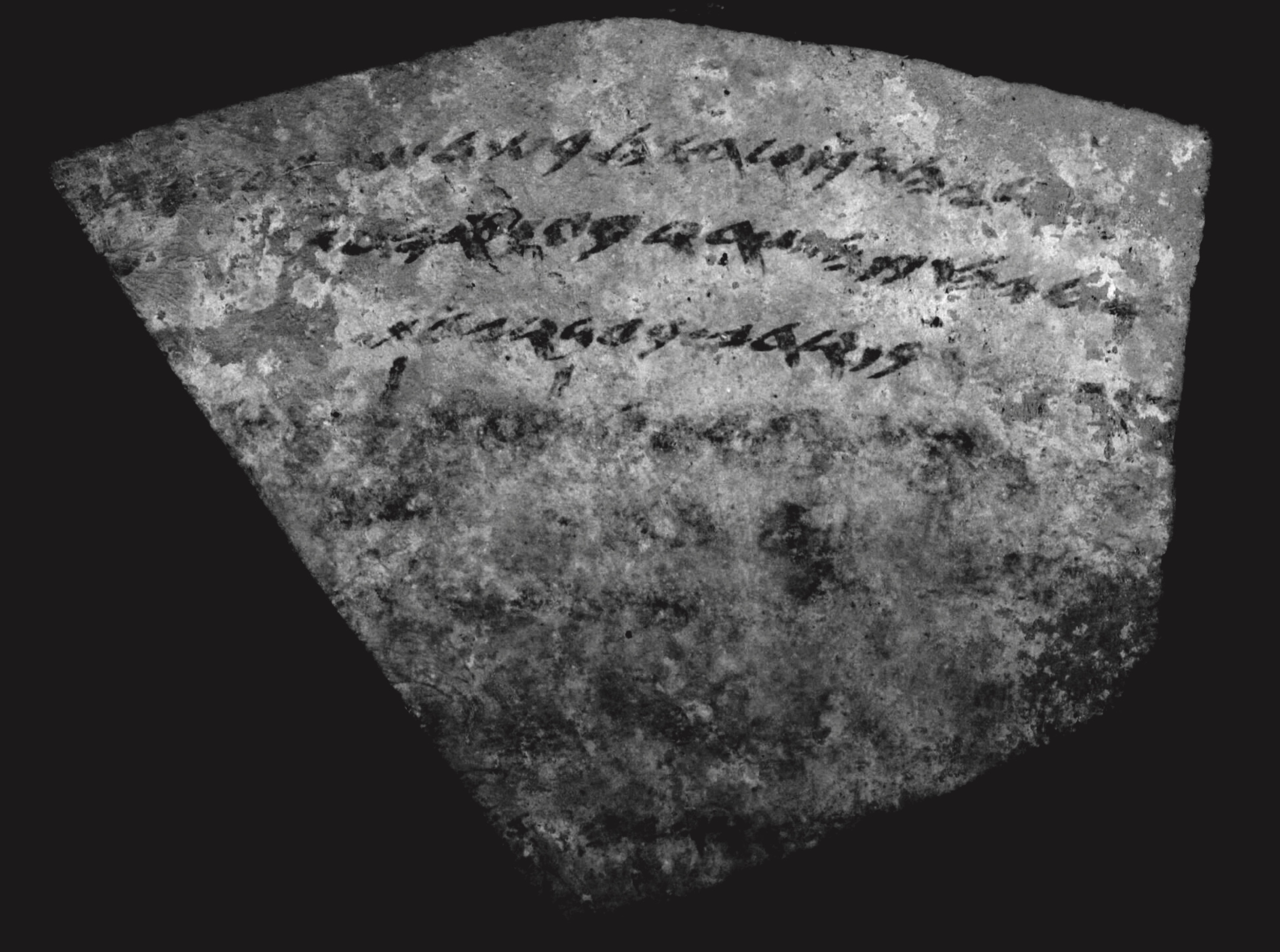

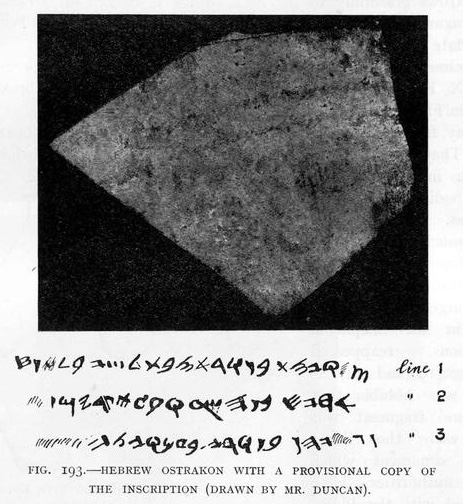
The ostracon as discovered in 1924; displayed in the editio princeps

The Ophel ostracon or KAI 190, is an ostracon discovered in East Jerusalem in 1924 by R. A. Stewart Macalister and John Garrow Duncan in the area that was referred to at the time as Mount Ophel. The area is now commonly referred to as the City of David by archaeologists and tourists or Wadi Hilweh by local residents. It is attributed to the 7th century BCE.

== Discovery ==
Macalister and Duncan described the discovery as follows, referring to the 1909 expedition of Montagu Brownlow Parker:

This sherd was discovered in the large cave under Field No. 9, and seems to have formed part of the dump which the Parker party deposited in that cave; its exact original provenance is therefore uncertain, though it must have come from somewhere in the neighboring tunnel, and probably not far off.

The ostracon measures 4 inches by 3 inches. The inscription, written in Pre-Exilic Hebrew, is thought to have originally been eight lines, of which five are decipherable (the first four and the last).

It is currently at the Rockefeller Museum.

== See also ==
- Ophel pithos
- Archaeology of Israel
