= Siege of Jebus =

Siege described in the Hebrew Bible

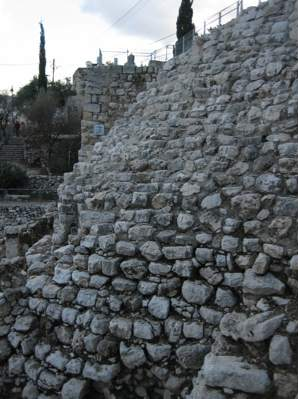
- Jebusite walls in the City of David, 2006
Date	c. 1010 BCE
Location	Jerusalem, Canaan 31°47′N 35°13′E
Result	Israelite victory
Territorial changes	Jebus (Jerusalem) is established as the capital city of Israel and Judah

Belligerents
United Kingdom of Israel		Jebusites

Commanders and leaders
David	Unknown	

The siege of Jebus is described in passages of the Hebrew Bible as having occurred when the Israelites, led by King David, besieged and conquered the Canaanite city of Jerusalem, then known as Jebus (Hebrew: יבוס, Yəḇūs, transl. 'threshing-floor'). The Israelites gained access to the city by conducting a surprise assault, and Jebus (or Jerusalem) was subsequently installed as the capital city of the United Kingdom of Israel under its initial name as the City of David.

The identification of Jebus with Jerusalem has been challenged. Danish biblical scholar Niels Peter Lemche notes that every non-biblical mention of Jerusalem found in the ancient Near East refers to the city with the name of Jerusalem, offering as an example the Amarna letters, which are dated to the 14th century BCE and refer to Jerusalem as Úrusalim. He states that "There is no evidence of Jebus and the Jebusites outside of the Old Testament. Some scholars reckon Jebus to be a different place from Jerusalem; other scholars prefer to see the name of Jebus as a kind of pseudo-ethnic name without any historical background".

== Biblical description ==
The capture of Jebus is mentioned in 2 Samuel 5 and 1 Chronicles 11 with similar wordings:

And David and all Israel went to Jerusalem, that is, Jebus, where the Jebusites were, the inhabitants of the land. The inhabitants of Jebus said to David, "You will not come in here." Nevertheless, David took the stronghold of Zion, that is, the city of David.

— 1 Chronicles 11:4–5

== Archeological evidence ==
A 10-years study with Carbon 14 confirmed that the City of David was the City of Jebus, in the south-east region of the odiern Jerusalem, which is the most ancient area of the Israel's capital.

== See also ==
- Siege of Jerusalem (disambiguation), list of sieges for and battles of Jerusalem
