= City of David (archaeological site) =

Archaeological site in Jerusalem

- עיר דוד (Hebrew)
- Ir David (in Hebrew)
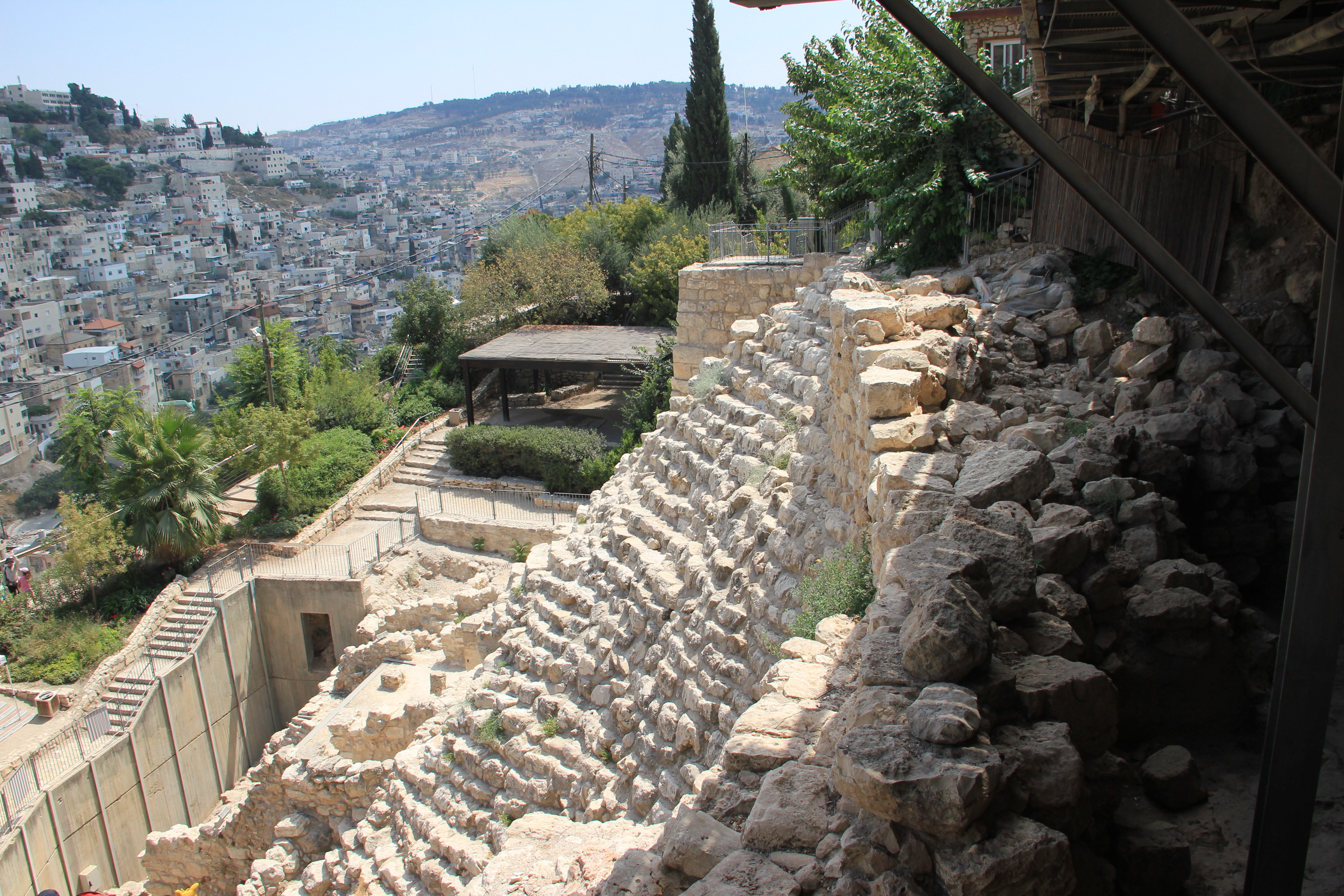
- Stepped Stone Structure

- Location within Old City of Jerusalem
- 31°46′25″N 35°14′08″E
- Type: settlement
- Periods: Bronze Age – Byzantine period
- Cultures: Canaanite, Israelite, Second Temple Judaism, Byzantine
- Location: Jerusalem

History
- Event(s): Siege of Jebus, Assyrian siege of Jerusalem, Babylonian siege of Jerusalem

Site notes
- Archaeologists: Charles Warren, Conard Schick, K.M. Kenyon, Yigal Shiloh, Ronny Reich, Eli Shukron, Doron Ben-Ami, Eilat Mazar and others
- Condition: In ruins; national park, made accessible to visitors
- Management: Israel Nature and Parks Authority, Ir David Foundation
- Public access: yes
- Website: https://www.cityofdavid.org.il/en

The City of David (Hebrew: עיר דוד, romanized: ʿĪr Davīd), known locally mostly in Arabic as Wadi Hilweh (Arabic: وادي حلوة, romanized: Wādī Ḥulwah), is the name given to an archaeological site considered by most scholars to be the original settlement core of Jerusalem during the Bronze and Iron Ages. It is situated on southern part of the eastern ridge of ancient Jerusalem, west of the Kidron Valley and east of the Tyropoeon Valley, to the immediate south of the Temple Mount and separated from it by the so-called Ophel saddle.

The City of David is an important site of biblical archeology. Remains of a defensive network dating to the Middle Bronze Age were found around the Gihon Spring; it remained in use throughout subsequent periods. Two monumental Iron Age structures, known as the Large Stone Structure and the Stepped Stone Structure, were discovered at the site. Scholars debate if these may be identified with David or date to a later period. The site is also home to the Siloam Tunnel, which, according to a common hypothesis, was built by Hezekiah during the late 8th century BCE in preparation for an Assyrian siege. However, recent excavations at the site suggested an earlier origin in the late 9th or early 8th century BCE. Remains from the early Roman period include the Pool of Siloam and the Stepped Street, which stretched from the pool to the Temple Mount.

The excavated parts of the archeological site are today part of the Jerusalem Walls National Park. (Note: According to The Israeli National Parks website, the park is also referred to as Jerusalem Walls-City of David National Park "One of the most important sites in the Jerusalem Walls National Park is the City of David (ancient Jerusalem).") The site is managed by the Israel Nature and Parks Authority and operated by the Ir David Foundation. The area was referred to by multiple names in the 20th century. In 2015, Israel's Jerusalem Municipality controversially, and in a move strongly opposed by East Jerusalem residents, renamed the area around site using Hebrew names and referencing the City of David in Hebrew. Local residents consider the location to be Wadi Hilweh, an extension of the Palestinian neighborhood of Silwan, East Jerusalem, intertwined with an Israeli settlement.

== Modern rediscovery and renaming of the site ==
=== Meaning of the site name ===
The name "City of David" originates in the biblical narrative where Israelite king David conquers Jerusalem, then known as Jebus, from the Jebusites. David's conquest of the city is described twice in the Bible: once in the Books of Samuel and once in the Books of Chronicles; those two versions vary in certain details. In his Antiquities of the Jews, 1st-century Jewish-Roman historian Josephus repeated the story. The reliability of the Bible for the time period's history is subject to debate among scholars.

According to the Hebrew Bible, the name "City of David" was applied to Jerusalem after its conquest by David c. 1000 BCE, and is not to be confused with the modern organization by the same name and which showcases relatively small excavated portions of the larger city. It is first mentioned in the Hebrew Bible, in 1 Kings 11:27, in 2 Samuel 5:9, in 2 Chronicles 32:30 and in Nehemiah 3:15–16, being the name given to Jerusalem after it had been conquered by King David and who is said to have ruled in the city for 33 years.

=== History of the site names ===
The area was known as Mount Ophel during the late Ottoman period. Montagu Parker claimed in a 1911 interview that his expedition had provided evidence that the "ancient City of David" was on Mount Ophel. However, the expedition ended in an international scandal and his team had to flee accusations of theft and site desecration. The first professional archaeologist to identify the site as the City of David was Raymond Weill in 1913. The British Mandatory Palestine administration referred to the archaeological site as the "City of David" on Mount Ophel by 1923 when discussing excavations. However, use of the name was not consistent at the time. On old maps, the site appears as Ophel. The last original reference to Mount Ophel in The New York Times, which used the word "ridge," was in 1981. The area was known in Hebrew as Kfar HaShiloah and in Arabic the Wadi al-Nabah neighborhood of Silwan. As of 2026, Israeli government map data lists a road to the north of the site as the Ophel, but it is not used as an area name. The neighborhood area has been renamed City of David. The area's majority Palestinian Arab residents referred to it as Wadi Hilweh after the wife of the local mukhtar who was killed in the 1948 Arab–Israeli War. Rannfrid Thelle wrote that the title "City of David" favors the "Jewish national agenda" and appeals to its Christian supporters.

=== Interest in the site ===
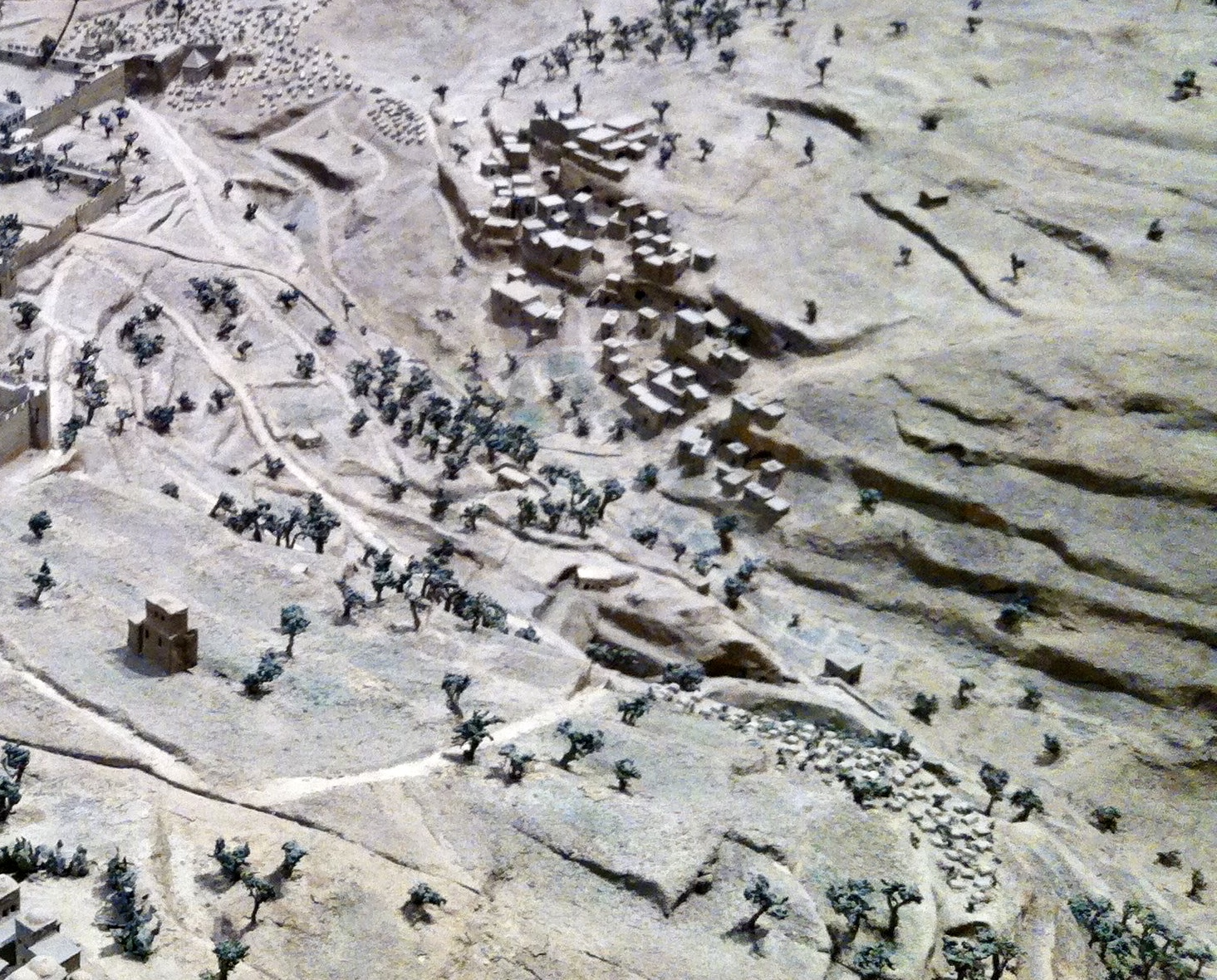
c.1870 (Illés Relief)

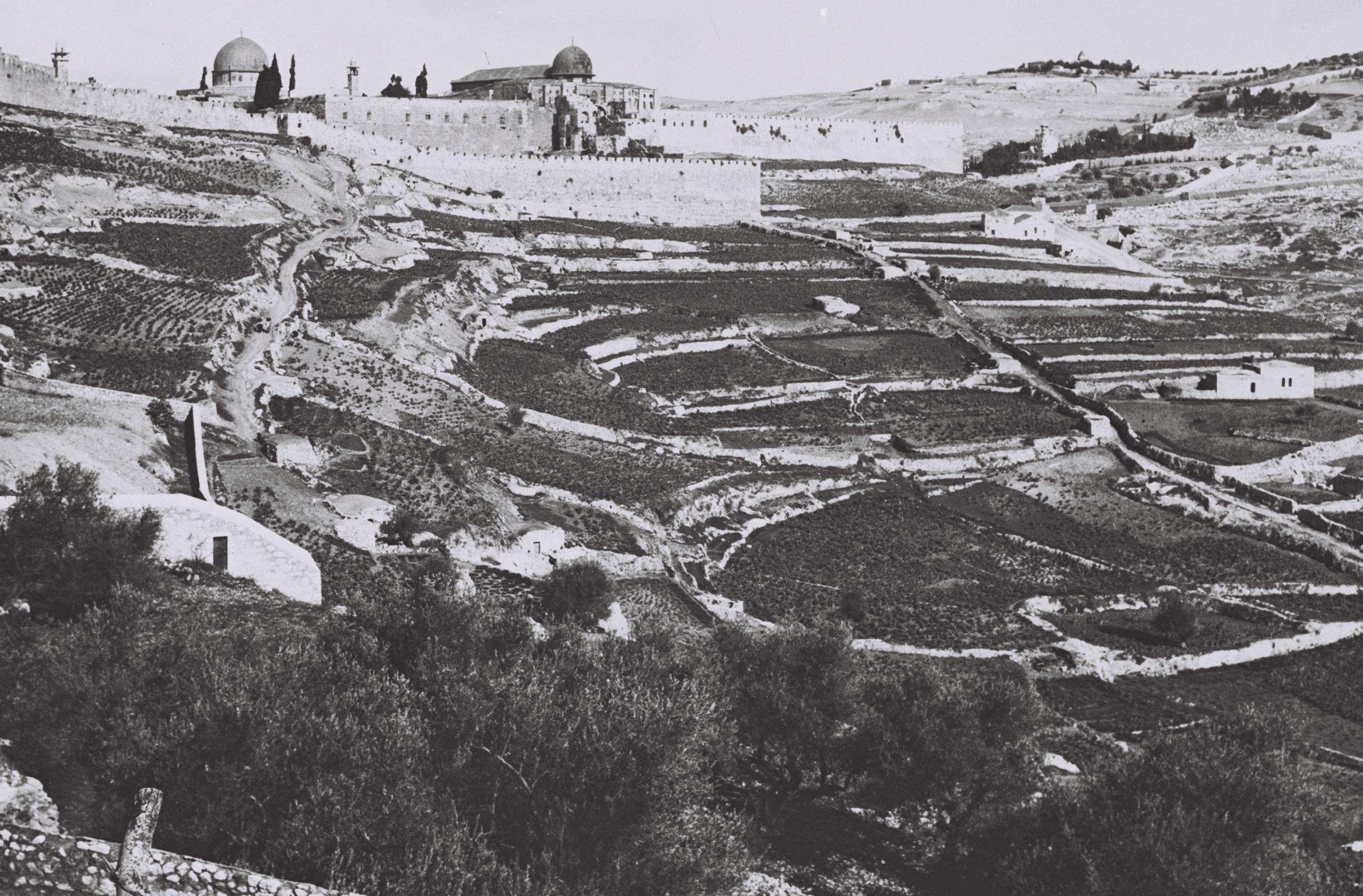
1910

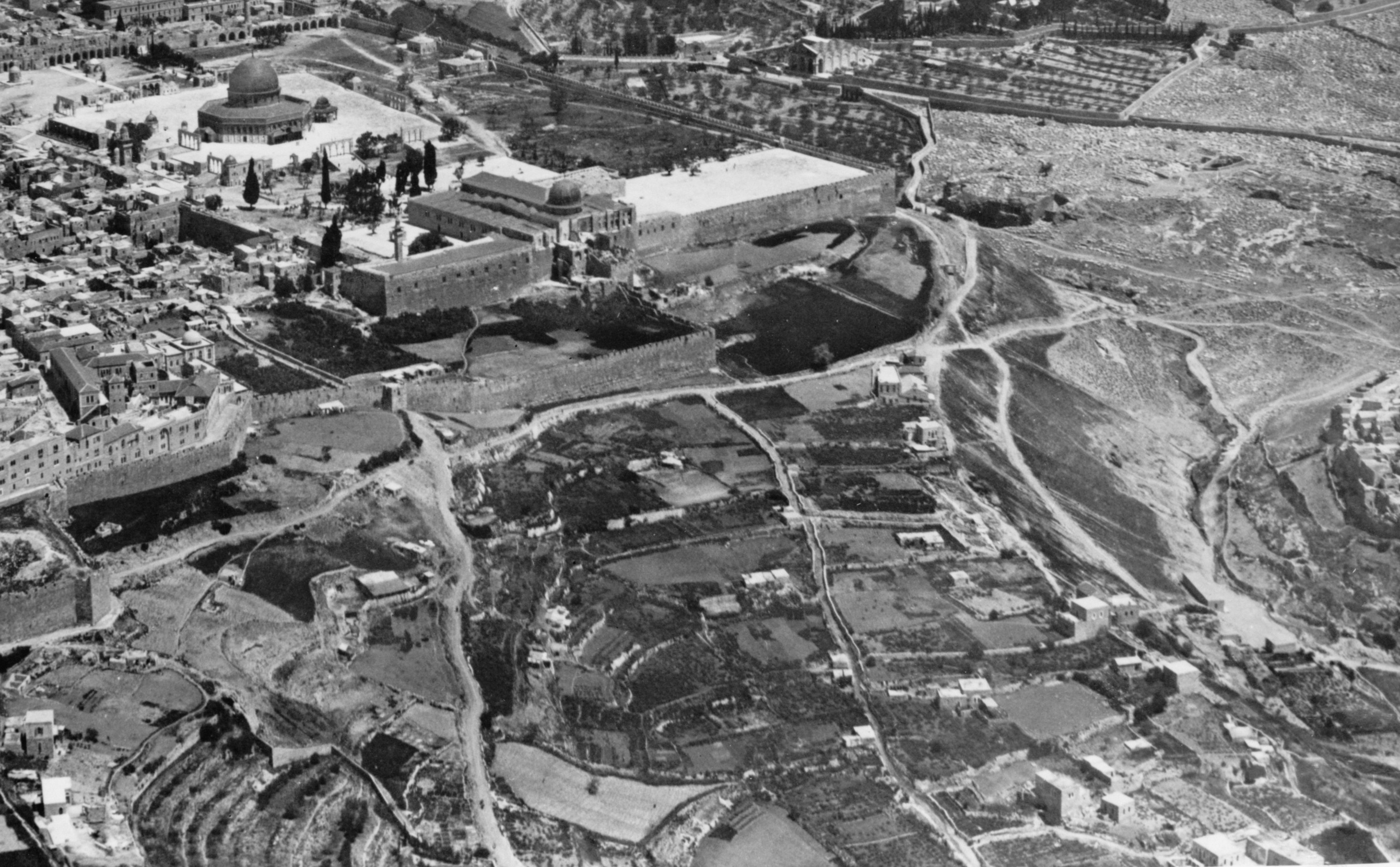
1931

Development of the Mount Ophel / City of David / Wadi Hilweh area 1870–1931. A few small buildings can be seen on the hill facing the houses of Silwan in 1870; additional houses were constructed in the following decades

The general area has been of interest to archaeologists since the 1864 Ordnance Survey of Jerusalem and 1865 founding of the Palestine Exploration Fund. However, it was not of significant interest to visitors to Jerusalem. James Feron, the New York Times Jerusalem correspondent, wrote in 1970 that the area then consisted of low scattered homes that were ignored by tourists "overwhelmed with the beauty, color and tradition of more spectacular sites just inside the walls." He included a photo of the area taken from a camera pointed away from the archaeological site.

The situation slowly began to change. Dame Kathleen Kenyon, one of the most influential archaeologists of the 20th century, had led an investigation at the site under the control of Jordanian Department of Antiquities. She spent six years from 1961 to 1967 excavating the area and publishing her findings. The stated main object was producing a plan of Roman Jerusalem. However, a far more ancient 3,800-year-old city wall was discovered. The excavation ended up also producing plans for the "Davidic and Solomonic cities of the Iron Age" using partial evidence that was "reasonably certain."

"In American circles at least, Syro‐Palestinian [biblical] archaeology has been traditionally dependent upon churches, theological seminaries and conservative religious circles." This changed in the late 1960s as "large‐scale financial support from foundations and especially from the United States Government has brought about a transformation." By 1971, student volunteers from the United States and Western Europe were doing the work that had previously been performed by laborers. During this time, Hezekiah's Tunnel (the Siloam tunnel) began to receive several thousands of visitors a year. Mendel Kaplan donated money to turn the site into the "City of David Archeological Park," generating increased interest. In 1985, the site was still one that "requires the tourist to work ... the eye sees little more than piles of stones, not streets and houses." Professor Yigal Shiloh planned to create a massive site over a two-year period, with tourist infrastructure to show tourists structures from the Canaanite and Biblical eras. Two years later, Professor Shiloh died of cancer, leaving years of work remaining to complete his plans for the site. However, his accidental discovery of the first structure dated to around the time of David and Solomon drew widespread public interest and funding for more excavations from a new site backer. Annual visitor numbers grew from tens of thousands to hundreds of thousands.

== Location ==
The archaeological site is on a rocky spur south of the Temple Mount and outside the walls of the Old City of Jerusalem, sometimes described as the southeastern ridge of ancient Jerusalem. The hill descends from the Dung Gate toward the Gihon Spring and the Pool of Siloam.

The archeological site is part of the majority Palestinian neighborhood known as Wadi Hilweh in Arabic. The area was renamed after the site from Mount Ophel in English and Hebrew, but the Arabic name remained in common use. For much of the 20th century, it was part of the village of Silwan, which was historically centered on the slopes of the southern part of the Mount of Olives, east of the City of David. Silwan spread west and crossed the valley to the eastern hill, the site of the ancient city.

== Excavations and scholarly views ==
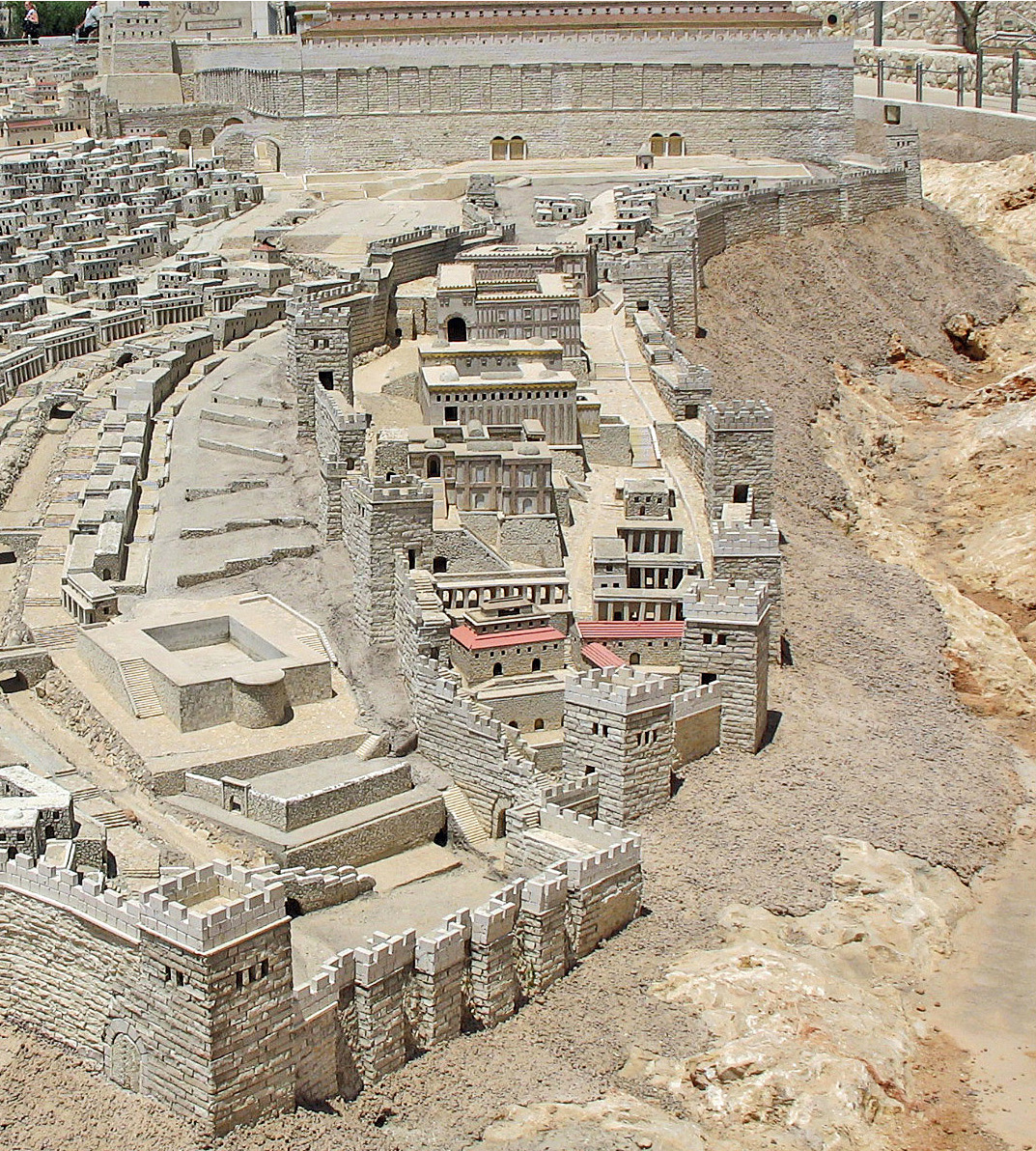
The Biblical City of David in the period of Herod's Temple, from the Holyland Model of Jerusalem. The southern wall of the Temple Mount appears at top.

The prevailing view among archaeologists is that the ancient site of the City of David lay on an elongated spur facing north–south, extending beyond the wall of the Old City, south of its southeastern corner, in the southern part of the eastern ridge next to the Gihon Spring. The City of David was the ancient epicenter of Jerusalem and whose boundaries stretched from the Temple Mount in the north, thence southward to the Pool of Siloam, including the area marking the Kidron brook in the east and the adjacent dale in the west. Its area is about 50 dunams (ca. 12.3 acres).

The beginning of its settlement dates back to the Chalcolithic period and the Early Bronze Age, largely built-up around the natural spring, although not known then by the name City of David. The Old Testament claims that, after the conquest of Jerusalem, an earlier name for the site, Jebus, was replaced by the term "City of David". David's son, Solomon, extended the wall to the north and added to it the area of the Temple Mount whereon he built an edifice (Temple) to the God of his fathers. From the eighth century BCE, the city began to expand westward beyond the dale.

The debate within biblical archaeology on whether this site on the hill southeast of the Old City could be identified with what the Hebrew Bible calls Jebus and later the City of David, began in the late 19th century with the excavations of Charles Warren and Hermann Guthe. The 1909–11 work of Louis-Hugues Vincent and Montagu Brownlow Parker identified the earliest known settlement traces in the Jerusalem region, suggesting the area was an ancient core of settlement in Jerusalem dating back to the Bronze Age.

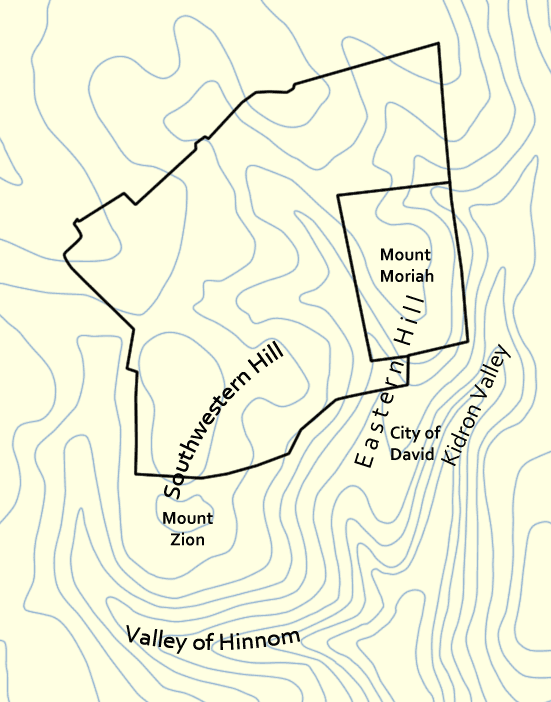
Topographical map of Jerusalem showing the approximate location of the "City of David" site

One of the stated objectives of the Palestine Exploration Fund (PEF) since its establishment in 1865 was to search for the true location of the biblical "City of David" and to report on its findings. However, after 130 years of research, surveys, and excavations in Jerusalem, only a few of the targets relating to the area of the City of David have been achieved and neither the location of the tombs of David and Solomon or the Ophel are known.

The City of David is one of the most excavated archaeological sites in the country and one of the first to be excavated. Many researchers of Near Eastern history often took part in digs within the City of David, among whom were: C. Warren, 1867–1870; H. Guthe, 1881; F. J. Bliss and A. C. Dickie, 1894–1897; R. Weill, 1913–1914 and 1923–1924; M. Parker and L. Vincent, 1909–1911, in which they documented the location of tunnels and artifacts discovered in and on the bedrock in the areas around Warren's Shaft on the eastern slopes of the mountain above the Gihon Spring; R. A. S. Macalister and J. G. Duncan, 1923–1925, who discovered the Ophel ostracon in Wadi Hilweh of the City of David; J. W. Crowfoot and G. M. Fitzgerald, 1927–1928; K. M. Kenyon, in the years 1961–1967; Y. Shilo, 1978 to 1985; and more.

More recent excavations (2000–2008) were conducted by R. Reich and E. Shukron on behalf of the Israel Antiquities Authority, and where they detailed Iron Age II findings in a rock-cut pool near the Gihon spring. In the "City of David Visitors' Center," before it was opened to the public, excavations were conducted in and around the general area of that site by a team of IAA archaeologists, again confirming the existence of a city dating back to the Iron Age II, and continuing unabated to the Early Roman period, and which, when the Jewish exiles returned to Jerusalem after the Babylonian captivity in the days of Ezra and Nehemiah, they continued to call the immediate area surrounding the Pool of Siloam by the name "City of David," although this name was eventually replaced by the name Accra (חקרא).

According to Haaretz, "the prevailing theory in mainstream scholarship, that even if such rulers existed, they were monarchs of a tiny backwater." Today, scholars are divided amongst those who support the historicity of the biblical narrative of a united monarchy ruled by David, those who completely deny its existence and those who support its existence but believe that the Hebrew Bible contains theological exaggerations. A view held by Finkelstein, Koch & Lipschits (2011) that the City of David is to be placed on the Temple Mount has largely been rejected by scholars of historical geography.

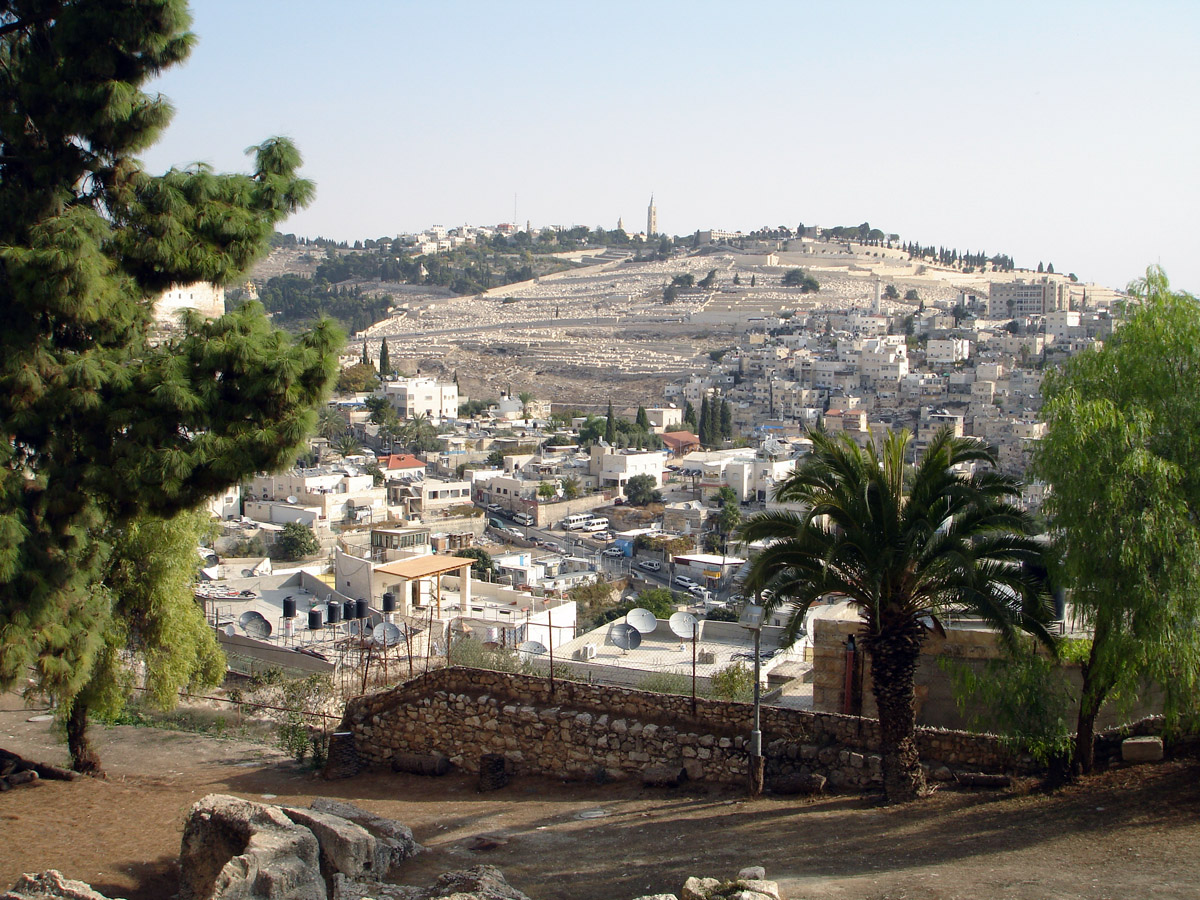
The City of David and the Mount of Olives

== Archaeological outline ==
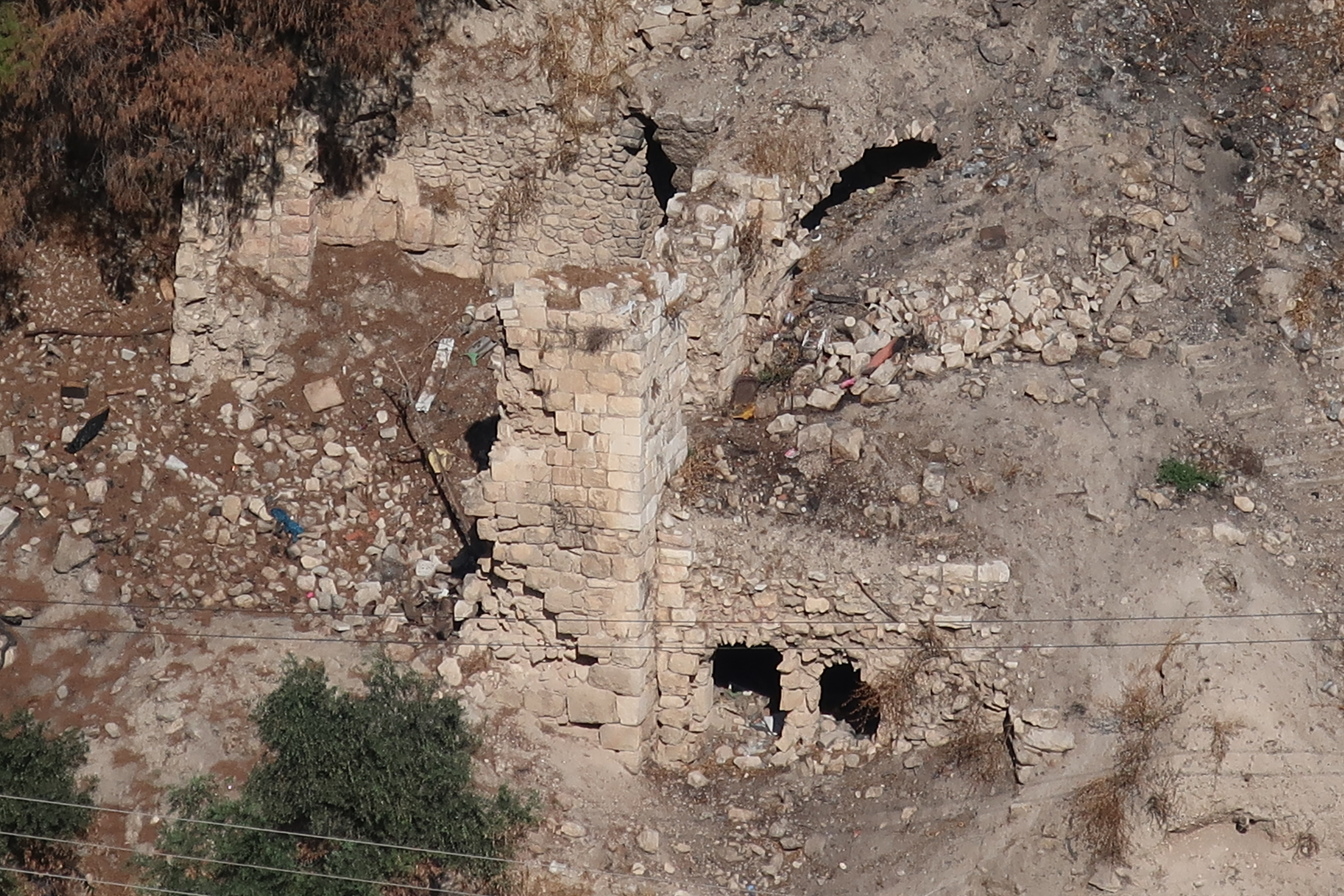
Unexcavated ruins of a house in the City of David (Silwan)

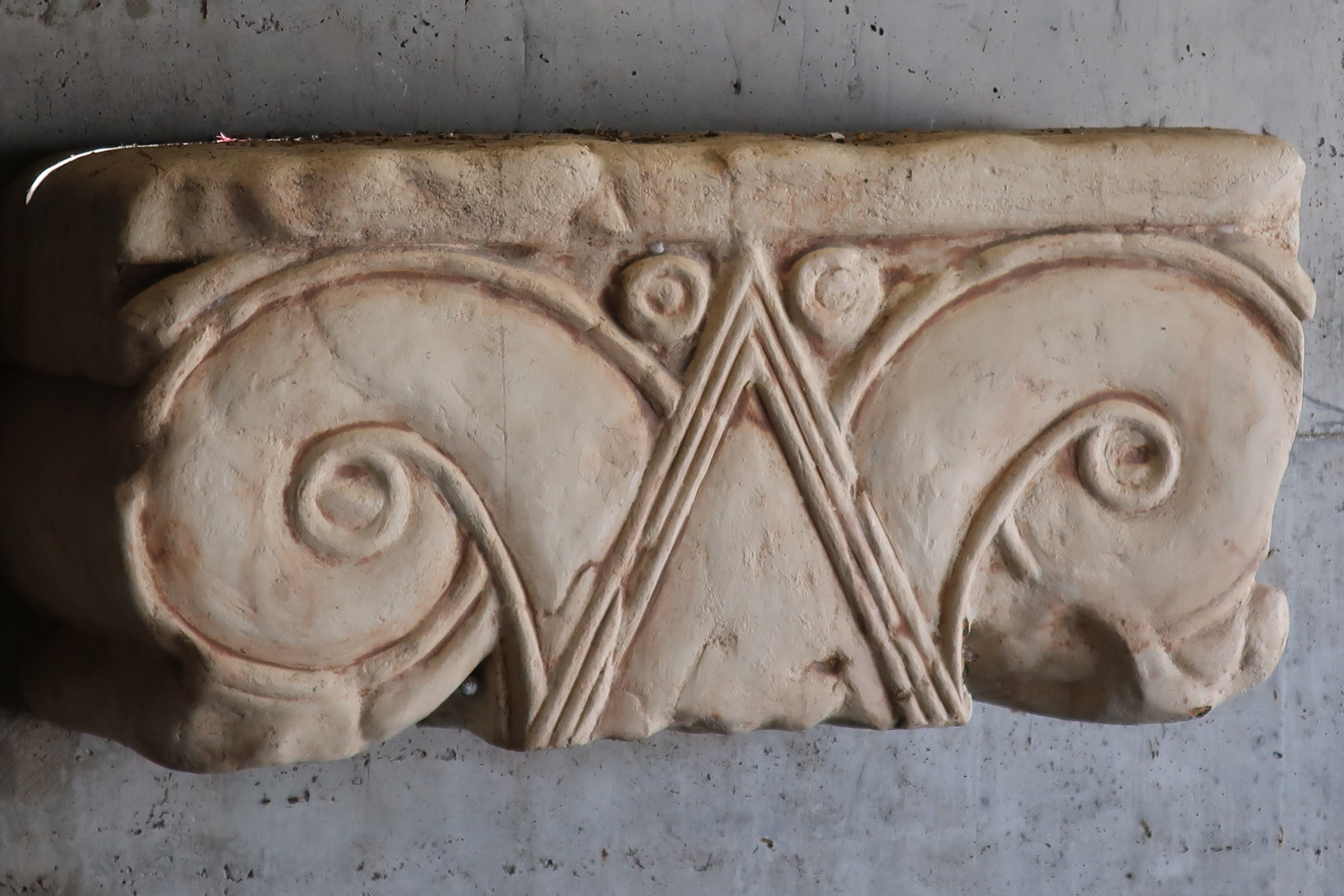
Monumental stone structure of the Proto-Aeolic style unearthed in the City of David (Givati Parking Lot)

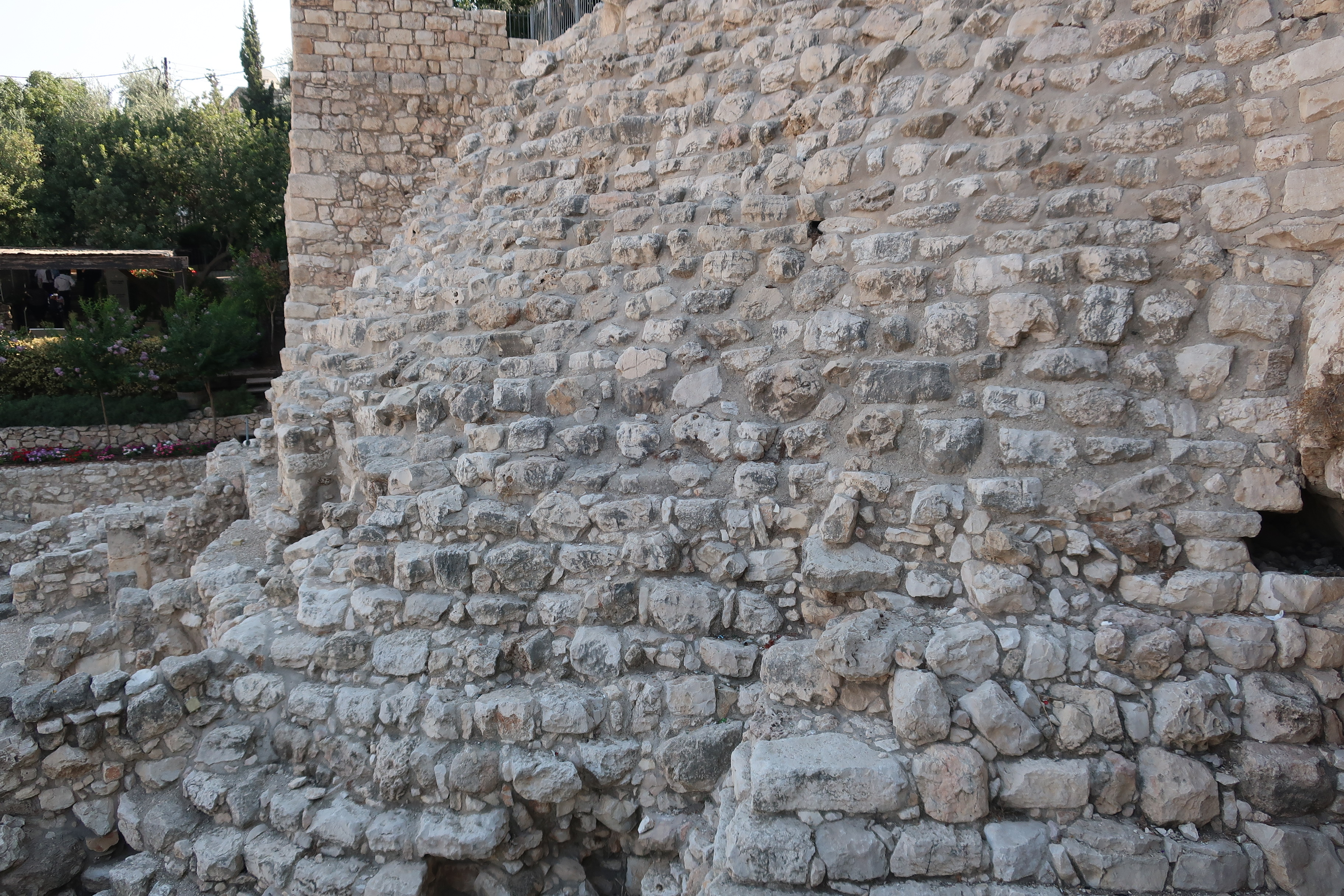
Stepped structure unearthed at the ancient City of David (Jerusalem)

=== Overview ===
The area is one of the most intensively excavated sites in the Holy Land. Archaeological practice at the site has been criticized for its practitioners not acknowledging political and corporate motivations, questionable field practice and overtly skewed interpretations.

=== Location and topography ===
It is on a narrow ridge running south from the Temple Mount. The site has a good defensive position, as it is almost surrounded by the Central or Tyropoeon Valley to its west, by the Hinnom Valley to the south, and the Kidron Valley on the east.

The ridge is currently inside the predominantly Arab neighborhood of Wadi Hilweh, which is part of Silwan, an East Jerusalem suburb.

=== Bronze and Iron Age ===
It is thought to have been the site of a walled city from the Bronze Age, which enjoyed the defensive advantages of its position. In the pre-Israelite period, the area is thought to have been separated from the site of the later Temple Mount by the Ophel, an uninhabited area which became the seat of government under Israelite rule.

In 2014, excavations at the Givati parking lot argued there had been no 10th-century BCE city wall, meaning: no fortified settlement in the City of David during the Iron IIA (c. 1000–925 BCE), the time span usually proposed by biblical scholars for the reigns of David, Solomon and Rehoboam. In 2024, evidence at the Givati dig suggested that a "monumental moat" had existed at the site 3,000 years ago.

During the reign of Hezekiah (reign c. 716–697/687 BCE), the walls of Jerusalem were expanded westward, across the Central Valley from the City of David and the Temple Mount, enclosing a previously unwalled suburb in the area known today as the Western Hill of the Old City.

=== Exploration ===
Archaeological exploration of the area began in the nineteenth century, with excavations undertaken by Charles Warren in 1867. Warren was sent by the Palestine Exploration Fund. Warren excavated the area south of the Temple Mount and uncovered a massive fortification. The finding led him to conduct more excavations in the area south of the Temple Mount. There, he revealed a vertical shaft descending from a slanted tunnel to an apparent water source. He suggested that the shaft was used to supply water to the city, which he believed was the old biblical city of David. The shaft was named "Warren's shaft" after its discoverer, but his interpretation has been proven wrong, as the shaft is not man-made and was not yet known to Jerusalem's inhabitants in the 10th century BCE.

There have been numerous excavations since, and several digs are currently underway. Complete chronological lists of the digs are available at the website of the Israel Antiquities Authority, dating to the following periods:

- Late Ottoman
- British Mandate
- Jordanian
- Early Israeli

In 2010, an archaeological survey of the City of David was conducted by Rina Avner, Eliahu Shukron and Ronny Reich, on behalf of the Israel Antiquities Authority (IAA). In 2012–2013, two teams of archaeologists conducted surveys of the area on behalf of the IAA; one led by Joseph (Joe) Uzziel, and the other by Yuval Gadot. Archaeological surveys in the City of David continued in 2014, led by Uzziel, and Nahshon Szanton.

=== Dating ===
A four-year project started in 2017, called "Setting the Clock in the City of David" and led by Yuval Gadot, an archaeologist at Tel Aviv University together with Elisabetta Boaretto (Weizmann Institute of Science), plus two Israel Antiquities Authority archaeologists, Joe Uziel and Doron Ben Ami, intends to carbon-14 date sites in Jerusalem. At the time only ten reliable carbon dates existed from all of the city's digs. According to Gadot, the chronology of Jerusalem is "an assumption on an assumption on an assumption". The results of several studies have been published including for the Gihon Spring Tower and for Wilson's Arch.

== Archaeological sites ==
There are several excavated sections known as Area A, B, C, etc., which include city walls, water systems, remains of buildings and more.

The City of David is traditionally considered to be on the ridge squeezed in by the Central (Tyropoeon) Valley to the west and the Qidron Valley to the east, with the Hinnom Valley bordering it from the south, and distinct from the Ophel saddle area to its north and with the city walls ending before the King's Garden to the south. Here is an incomplete overview of archaeological sites inside the presumed city, and adjacent to it.

=== Moat ===
An at least 70-metre long, 30-metre wide and 9-metre deep moat, separating the Southeastern Ridge from the Ophel and the top of the Temple Mount, was identified in 2023 in the Givati parking lot dig, with an additional segment to the east discovered by Kathleen Kenyon in the 1960s and now understood as part of the same defensive ditch. It is not possible to determine when it was hewn out of the bedrock, but it was in place by the Late Iron Age IIA, around 900 BCE. It reached from Jerusalem's central valley (Josephus' Tyropoeon Valley) in the west, to the western slopes of the Qidron Valley north of the Stepped Stone Structure, thus either protecting the northern walls of the Bronze Age city if it is indeed that old, or separating the Iron Age II, so Israelite acropolis, which possibly included the Temple Mount, from the residential part of the city. Researchers tentatively connected it to a passage from the Hebrew Bible, 1 Kings 11:27, where a gap in the walls of David's city is mentioned. After significantly modifying Jerusalem's topography for centuries, the moat disappeared again in the Late Hellenistic period, when it was backfilled as part of construction activities.

=== Upper (northern) area ===
In the uppermost (northern area):

- The Large Stone Structure
- The Stepped Stone Structure

City of David archaeologist Eilat Mazar believes that a so-called Large Stone Structure she has discovered at the upper area of the site and tentatively dated to the tenth to ninth century BC, may be the palace of King David. Not far from that excavation area a number of bullae (seal impressions) were unearthed, bearing the names of Yehucal son of Shelemiah and Gedaliah son of Pashhur, two officials mentioned in the Book of Jeremiah.

=== Gihon Spring and water systems ===
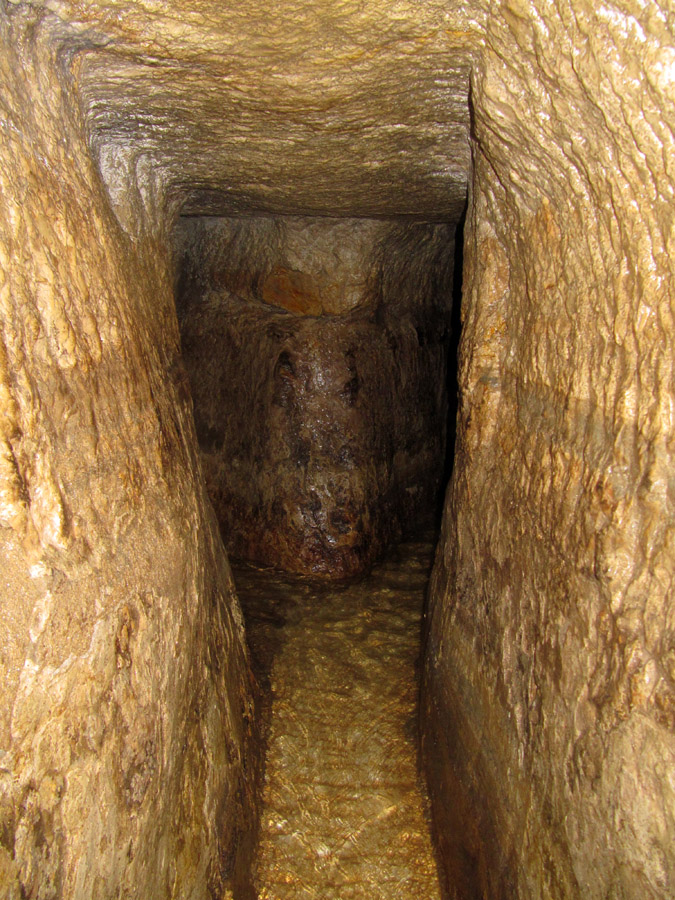
Inside the Siloam tunnel

The Gihon Spring is a major water source used in several successive ancient water systems.

The remains at the site include several water tunnels, one of which, the Siloam Tunnel, was built by King Hezekiah and still carries water, along with several pools, including the Pool of Siloam known from the Old and New Testaments.

- The Gihon Spring, which lies on the eastern slope of the southeastern hill of Jerusalem, a.k.a. the City of David, and is generally considered the very reason why the city first emerged at this specific location. It has been noted that above the Gihon Spring was found a massive town wall, which wall is used to determine the location of the ancient settlement.

The ancient water systems connected to the Gihon Spring include natural, masonry-built, and rock-cut structures, such as

- The Spring Tower
- Warren's Shaft, a natural shaft, once thought to have been a water supply system. Although within the bounds of the City of David, it is thought to have been inaccessible during the period attributed to King David.
- The Siloam Channel, a Canaanite (Bronze Age) water system that preceded the Siloam Tunnel
- The Siloam Tunnel (also known as Hezekiah's Tunnel), an Iron Age water supply system where the Siloam inscription was found
- The Siloam Pool - two connected pools, an upper one from the Byzantine period at the exit of the Siloam Tunnel, and the recently discovered, lower pool dating to the Hasmonean part of the Second Temple Period.

=== Eastern slope ===
On the eastern slope of the ridge, towards the Qidron Valley:

- City walls and towers, a columbarium, rock-cut vaulted tunnels once interpreted as royal Judahite tombs (T1 and T2), a rock-cut pool where the Theodotus Inscription was discovered (for associated synagogue see here), etc.

=== Central Valley street and channel ===
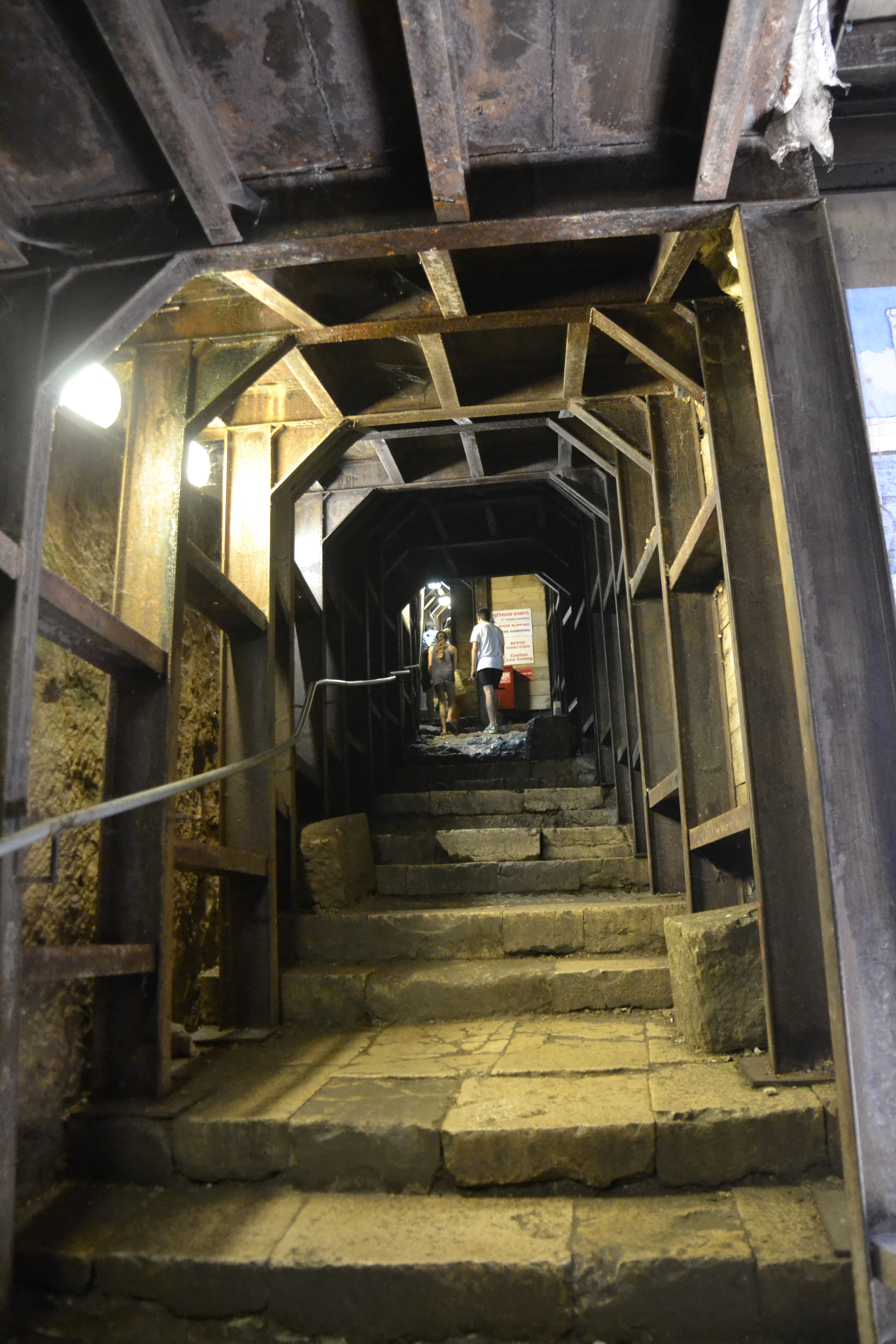
The stepped street ascending toward the Temple Mount

- The Jerusalem Water Channel, a large drainage system running down the Central (Tyropoeon) Valley, covered by the following:
- A monumental stepped street probably used by Second Temple-period pilgrims and built over the Jerusalem Water Channel.

=== South of the city ===
Outside the walls to the south:

- King's Garden (excavated in 1894–1897 by Bliss and Dickie).

=== Givati area west of Central Valley ===
The Giv'ati Parking Lot excavations extend over an area of about 5 dunams (1.2 acres).

Here archaeologists claim to have found the remains of the Acra, a fortress built by Antiochus Epiphanes to subdue those Jerusalemites who were opposed to Hellenisation.

=== Ophel area north of the city ===
See Ophel: Jerusalem ophel.

== Finds by period ==
The periodisation employed here is mainly based on Avraham Negev and Shimon Gibson's Archaeological Encyclopedia of the Holy Land (AEHL, 2001), which is also reflected on the page Timeline of the Palestine region, but updated and adapted where needed. Different researchers propose different periodisation systems.

=== Chalcolithic (4500–3500 BCE) ===
Chalcolithic remains include bits of pottery found in clefts in the bedrock by Macalister and Duncan. The expedition also discovered a number of places where the bedrock had been cut in various ways. These included areas where the rock had been smoothed and others where it had been cut to form flow channels. There were also several groups of small basins, sometimes called cup marks, cut into the bedrock. These are assumed to have been used for some form of agricultural processing. Macalister and Duncan speculated that they were used in olive oil processing.

Edwin C. M. van den Brink, who notes that similar carved basins have been found at Beit Shemesh and near Modi'in-Maccabim-Re'ut, speculates that they may have been created by repeated grinding and crushing activity, such as the grinding of grain or the crushing of olives. Eilat Mazar speculates that they were used to collect rainwater.

=== Early Bronze Age (3500–2350 BCE) ===
Pieces of pottery have been found.

=== Middle Bronze Age (2000–1550 BCE) ===
Middle Bronze Age Jerusalem is mentioned several times in Egyptian texts from the 19th–18th centuries BCE.

=== Late Bronze Age (1550–1200 BCE) ===
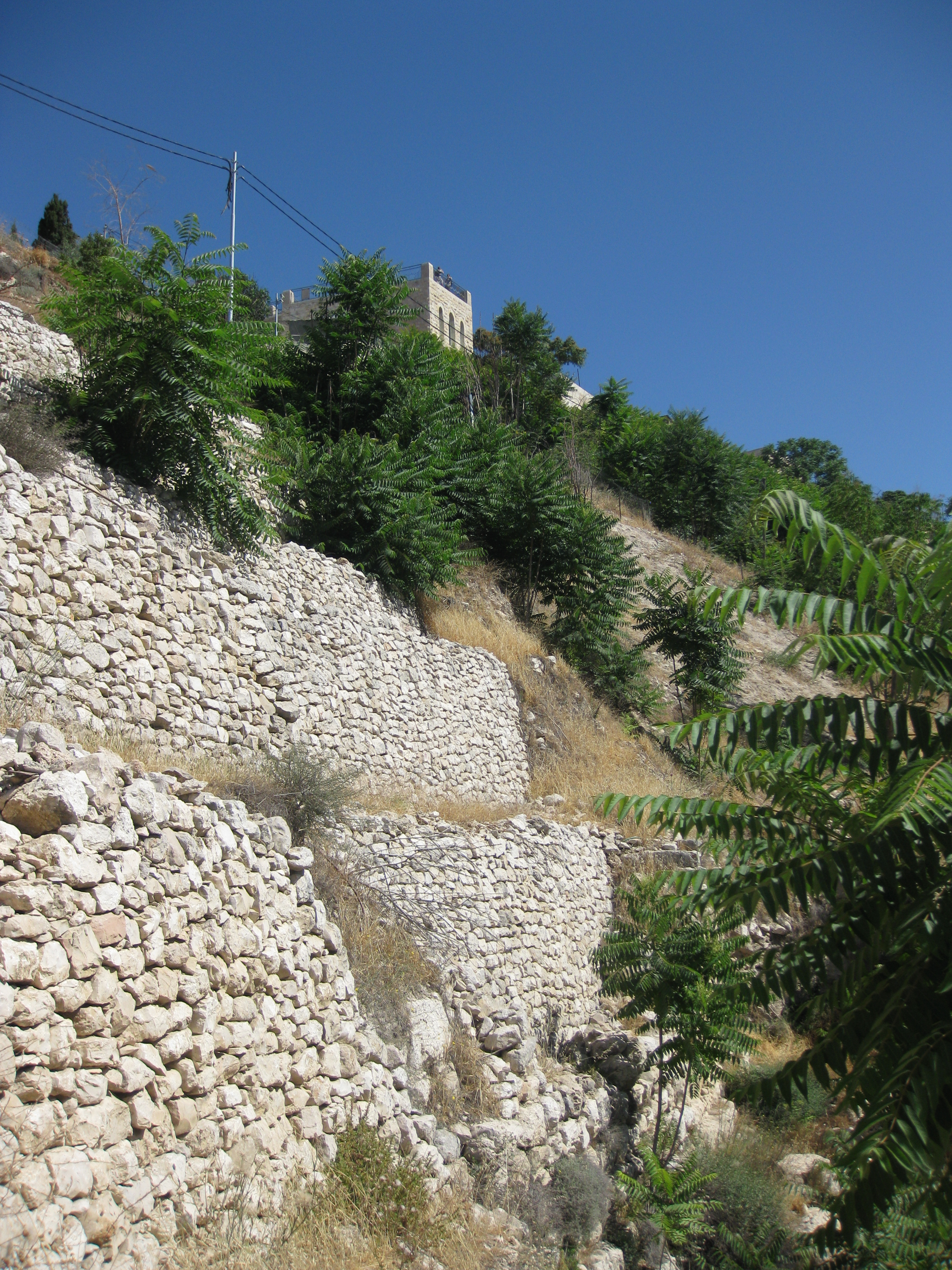
Canaanite city wall facing the Kidron Valley

Pottery and bronze arrowheads dating from this period have been found.

In 2010, a fragment of a clay tablet dating from the 14th century BCE was uncovered, making it the oldest written document yet uncovered in Jerusalem. It is dated by the writing it bears, in ancient Akkadian cuneiform. The text was deciphered by graduate student Takayoshi Oshima working under professor Wayne Horowitz. According to Horowitz, the quality of the writing indicates that this was a royal inscription, apparently a letter from the king of Jerusalem to the pharaoh in Egypt. Professor Christopher Rollston points out that there is no mention of any personal names or titles and no place names in the document. He notes that the quality of the script is good, but that this does not show that it is "international royal correspondence." He also suggests that caution should be taken before positing a definite date as it is not a stratified find, having been discovered after excavation in a "wet sieving" process.

=== Iron Age I (1200–1000/980/970 BCE) ===
In 2024, several researchers published a number of radiocarbon tests conducted in five different parts of the City of David which they argue provide evidence for the existence of an urban settlement in Jerusalem all through the 12th–10th centuries BCE.

=== Iron Age IIA (1000–900 BCE) ===
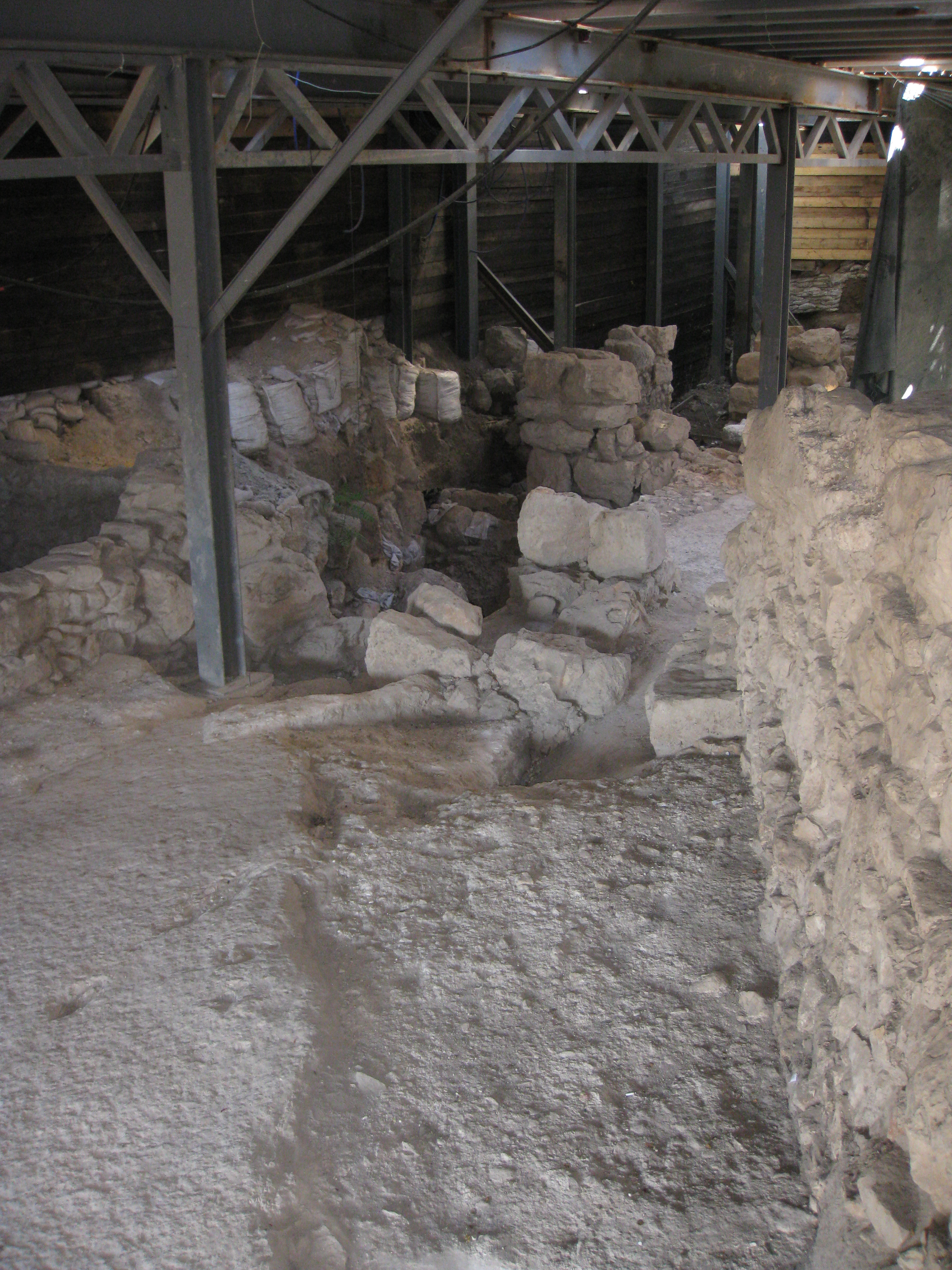
Part of the Large Stone Structure asserted by archaeologist Eilat Mazar to be the remains of King David's palace

The end of the IA IIA period may be set to 925 or 900 BCE.

The period of the tenth and ninth centuries BCE has been the subject of intense scholarly debate and ongoing archaeological investigations.

==== Large Stone Structure ====
The 2005 discovery by archaeologist Eilat Mazar of a Large Stone Structure, which she dated to the tenth century BCE, would be evidence of buildings in Jerusalem of a size appropriate to the capital of a centralized kingdom at that time. Others, most notably Israel Finkelstein of Tel Aviv University, argue that the structure could, for the most part, be from the much later Hasmonean period. However, new evidence continues to emerge from the dig. Mazar's date is supported by 10th-century imported luxury goods found within the Large Stone Structure, including two Phoenician-style ivory inlays once attached to iron objects. Comparable objects found in a Phoenician tomb at Achziv suggest that they may have decorated a sword handle. A quantity of luxury round, carinated bowls with red slip and hand burnishing support both the tenth-century date and a sophisticated, urban lifestyle. A bone has been radiocarbon dated by Elisabetta Boaretto at the Weizmann Institute, showing a probable date between 1050 and 780 BCE. A large section of a "delicate and elegant" black-on-red jug, also found in the structure, is of a kind dated to the second half of the tenth century BCE.

==== Northern wall (date disputed) ====
In 2010 Mazar announced the discovery in the Ophel area north of the City of David of what she believed to be a 10th-century BCE city wall. According to Mazar, "It's the most significant construction we have from First Temple days in Israel," and "It means that at that time, the 10th century, in Jerusalem there was a regime capable of carrying out such construction." Aren Maeir, an archaeology professor at Bar Ilan University, said he has yet to see evidence that the fortifications are as old as Mazar claims.

==== Eastern wall ====
R. Reich and E. Shukron have excavated a monumental wall on the eastern slope of the hill. This ancient wall was preserved in its full height (6 m.), measuring 2 m. in width.

==== Missing western wall ====
Doron Ben-Ami wrote in 2014 that, on the basis of his own excavations in the Givati parking lot area bordering on the "City of David" from the north-west, there was apparently no 10th-century city wall: "Had a fortified settlement existed in the City of David, then the course of the city wall on the west would have had to pass through the Givati excavation area. No such city wall has been found thus far. This means that the Iron Age IIa settlement [c. 1000–925 BCE] was not fortified." In 2024, solving what was described as a "150-year-old mystery," archaeologists discovered a continuation of the moat that protected the city to the west.

=== Iron Age IIB (c. 925–720 BCE) ===
Ben-Ami goes on saying that his Givati findings indicate that "the fortified city of the Iron IIB, which encompassed both the City of David and the Western Hill, had no need for a fortification line between these two sectors of the city."

Excavations at Givati and other sites have shown that 9th-century Jerusalem "included an acropolis to the north and a city on the lower, southeastern, ridge with a barrier separating the two."

==== The related necropolis (9th–7th centuries BCE) ====
The elaborate rock-cut tombs of the Israelite period, forming what is known as the Silwan necropolis and dating from the 9th to the 7th centuries BCE, are found outside Wadi Hilweh/the City of David, on the ridge on the opposite, eastern side of the Kidron Valley in and under the Arab village of Silwan. These are large, elaborate tombs of skilfully cut into the stone face of the eastern slope, such as could only have been built by the highest-ranking members of a wealthy society. According to David Ussishkin, "here ministers, nobles and notables of the kingdom of Judah were buried."

The architecture of the tombs and the manner of burial is different "from anything known from contemporary Palestine. Elements such as entrances located high above the surface, gabled ceilings, straight ceilings with a cornice, 13 trough-shaped resting-places with pillows, above-ground tombs, and inscriptions engraved on the facade appear only here." However, the stone benches were carved with headrests in a style borrowed from the Egyptian Hathor wig. Ussishkin believes that the architectural similarity to building styles of the Phoenician cities validates the biblical description of Phoenician influence on the Israelite kingdoms, but speculates that some or all of the tombs may have been built by Phoenician aristocrats living in Jerusalem.

Although only three partial inscriptions survive, the paleography makes the dating certain and they suffice for most archaeologists to identify one tomb with the Biblical Shebna, steward and treasurer of King Hezekiah.

==== Monumental inscriptions (8th c. BCE) ====
During an archaeological dig in February 2008, a fragment of a monumental stone inscription was discovered on the east slope of the City of David hill. Broken on all sides and roughly triangular, the fragment is a maximum 13.5 cm high and 9.5 cm wide (5.3 x 3.7 inches), and contains on the smooth side the remains if two lines, with a total of six letters and a dot used for separating words. The limestone fragment was found in a fill among pottery sherds dated to the 8th century BCE, with the excavators, Reich and Shukron, also dating the inscription to that century. They suggest that the inscription was placed on an administrative building, but was smashed and the pieces thrown onto the slope during the same century, after which the found piece rolled down together with other material and collected downhill.

The three surviving palaeo-Hebrew letters from the first line, qof-yod-heh, seem to contain the ending of a theophoric name like 'Amaqyahu, Hizqiyahu, Hilqiyahu or Zidqiyahu, all known from Iron Age II inscriptions from Judah. The second line contains the signs kaf-heh-dot (word divider)-bet. Words ending in kh are few, including known ones like brkh 'pool' and tbrkh 'May she bless him', but other reconstructions like ml'kh 'work' are also possible.

The date is mainly based on the pottery finds and the location (fill down a slope). Three other fragmentary monumental inscriptions from the City of David and the adjacent Ophel from the same period, additional to the better known Siloam Inscription, are a good element of comparison, the lettering been between similar and identical. The authors note that unlike in an ink-written inscription, in a carved one the order of the strokes offers no additional epigraphic information.

Although only fragments of Hebrew lettering survive, the fragment proves that the city had monumental public inscriptions and the corresponding large public buildings in the eighth century.

The Biblical Archaeology Review offers a popular and speculative discussion by Hershel Shanks, who points at the possibility that the fragmentary name might be King Hezekiah's (Hizqiyahu in Hebrew), and that he could have placed the plaque on a public building he built in connection to the First Temple period iteration of the pool (brekha) at the termination of Hezekiah's Tunnel (the one we see today being of a later date).

=== Iron Age IIC (c. 720–586 BCE) ===
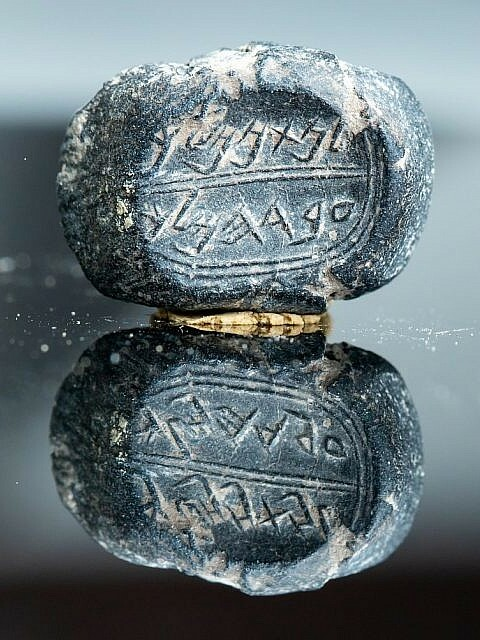
Paleo-Hebrew seal found in the City of David, part of a larger group of Canaanite and Aramaic seal inscriptions.

Some items also relating to this period are mentioned in the section above, due to overlaps or differences in either periodisation (years) or the dating range of the findings.

This is the period that corresponds to the biblical Kings Hezekiah through Josiah and the destruction of the Kingdom of Judah by Nebuchadnezzar II.

King Hezekiah secured the city's water supply against siege by employing his men to dig a 533 metres (1,749 ft) conduit deep within the meleke limestone bedrock and, in so doing, to divert the waters of the Gihon Spring to a place on the west side of the City of David, and covering over all signs of the source of the spring and the fortifications that had surrounded it in earlier periods. He built the Pool of Siloam as a water reservoir. Hezekiah then surrounded the new reservoir and the city's burgeoning western suburbs with a new city wall.

Bullae with the names of Yehucal son of Shelemiah and Gedaliah son of Pashhur, two officials mentioned in the Book of Jeremiah, have been found.

In 2019, during the excavations of the Givati Parking lot, a seal bearing a Paleo-Hebrew inscription was discovered, belonging to "Natan-Melech the King's Servant". In July 2026, sycamore wooden beams were discovered during excavations at the same site, believed by researchers to have served as the roof of an inner courtyard in a building burned during the destruction of the First Temple in 586 BCE.

=== Babylonian and Persian periods (586–322 BCE) ===
Two bullae in the Neo-Babylonian style, one showing a priest standing beside an altar to the gods Marduk and Nabu. A polished, black, scaraboid stone seal showing a "Babylonian cultic scene" of two bearded men standing on each side of an altar dedicated to the Babylonian moon god Sin. The scaraboid is understood to have been produced in Babylonia, with space left below that altar for a personal name. In that space are Hebrew letters that Peter van der Veen has read as the name Shelomit.

=== Hasmoneans, Herodians and Roman governors (167 BCE – 70 CE) ===
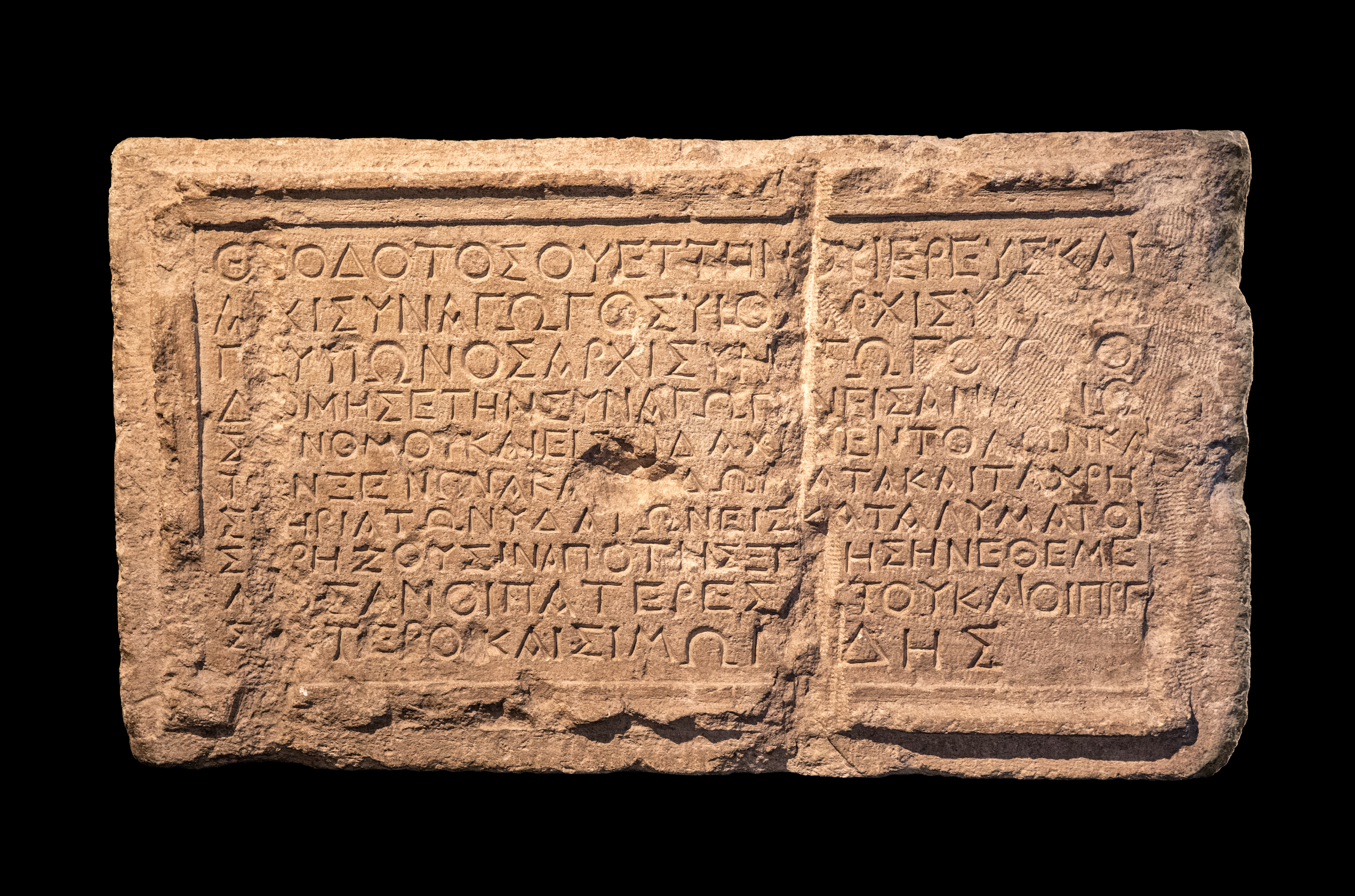
Theodotus Inscription, City of David, 1st century CE, indicating the existence of a synagogue at that site previous to 70 CE

Major archaeological finds include the Pool of Siloam, and the monumental stepped road built by Pilate and drained by an impressive channel. Active Roman-era excavations are also underway at the Givati Parking Lot dig site, where the remains of a palace attributed to Queen Helena of Adiabene were discovered in 2007.

=== Byzantine period (324–628 CE) ===
The Byzantine-period mansion called the "Eusebius" house stood in the area now underneath the visitor center, atop the central part of E. Mazar's Large Stone Structure.

During the excavation of the area adjacent to the west, the so-called Givati Parking Lot dig, many Byzantine-period finds were made, including a hoard of 264 gold coins from the time of Emperor Heraclius (7th century CE).

== Controversies ==
In 2014, Israeli archaeology at the site has been criticized; Tel Aviv University Professor Raphael Greenberg stated that archaeological practice at the site is "completely subsumed to political and corporate motivations that are, however, largely unacknowledged by its 'neutral' practitioners, leading to questionable field practice and overtly skewed interpretations of the past".

In a 2015 report on Israeli archaeology, the National Academy of Sciences criticized the political use of archeology and the extensive cooperation between Elad and the Nature and Parks Authority. Elad's head, David Be'eri, declined to appear before the committee and said the report was biased against Elad.

In 2018, a leaked report by the European Union cited the area as one being developed for tourism to justify Israeli settlements, considered illegal under international law, and insist on Jewish heritage at the expense of its Palestinian context.

== Tourism ==
The entire site, including the Gihon Spring and the two Pools of Siloam, is incorporated in an archaeological park open to the public. Visitors can wade through the Siloam Tunnel, through which the waters of the ancient spring still flow. Because of a change in the water table the once-intermittent karstic spring is artificially maintained through pumping.
